= Biel/Bienne =

- Municipality
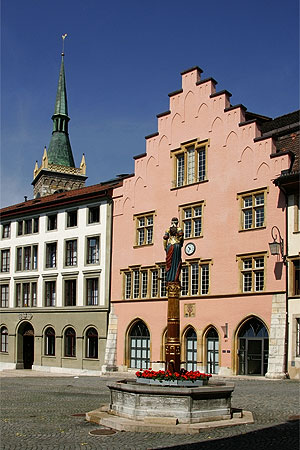
- City Hall in the Old Town of Biel/Bienne

- Flag Coat of arms
- Location of Biel/Bienne
- Location within Switzerland Location within Canton of Bern
- Coordinates: 47°08′N 7°15′E
- Country: Switzerland
- Canton: Bern
- District: Biel/Bienne

Government
  - Executive: Gemeinderat/Conseil municipal with 5 members
  - Mayor: Stadtpräsident/Maire (list); Glenda Gonzalez Bassi SPS/PSS (as of 2026)
  - Parliament: Stadtrat/Conseil de ville with 60 members

Area
  - Total: 21.21 km^{2} (8.19 sq mi)
- Elevation (Railway station): 437 m (1,434 ft)

Population (December 2020)
  - Total: 55,206
  - Density: 2,603/km^{2} (6,741/sq mi)
- Demonym(s): German: Bieler/in, French: Biennois(e)
- Time zone: UTC+01:00 (CET)
  - Summer (DST): UTC+02:00 (CEST)
- Postal code: 2500–2510
- SFOS number: 371
- ISO 3166 code: CH-BE
- Surrounded by: Brügg, Ipsach, Leubringen/Magglingen (Evilard/Macolin), Nidau, Orpund, Orvin, Pieterlen, Port, Safnern, Tüscherz-Alfermée, Vauffelin
- Twin towns: Iserlohn (Germany)
- Website: www.biel-bienne.ch

Logo

Biel/Bienne (official bilingual wording; German: Biel [biːl]; French: Bienne [bjɛn]; Alemannic German: Biu [biːu]) is a bilingual city and municipality in the canton of Bern in Switzerland. With over 55,000 residents, it is the country's tenth-largest city by population. The Biel/Bienne urban area has a population of around 100,000 inhabitants. Biel/Bienne is the capital of the Biel/Bienne administrative district. The city has been an industrial and watchmaking heart of Switzerland since the 19th century. With world-famous watch brands such as Rolex, Omega and Swatch based in Biel/Bienne, the city is one of the main centres of the Swiss watch industry and is also referred to as the "world capital of watchmaking".

Biel/Bienne lies on the language boundary between the French-speaking and German-speaking parts of Switzerland, and is bilingual throughout. Biel is the German name for the city whereas Bienne is its French counterpart. The city is often referred to in both languages simultaneously. Since 1 January 2005, the official name has been "Biel/Bienne". Until then, the town was officially named Biel or Bienne.

The city lies at the foot of the first mountain range of the Jura Mountains area, guarding the only practical connection to Jura, on the northeastern shores of Lake Biel (Bielersee, Lac de Bienne), sharing the eastern tip of the lake with its sister town, Nidau. The cities of Neuchâtel, Solothurn, and Bern (the capital of Switzerland) lie southwest, northeast and southeast of Biel/Bienne. They all can be reached within about 30 minutes by train or car. The cities of Zurich, Basel and Lausanne can each be reached in about one hour by car or train.

== History ==
=== Prehistoric settlements ===
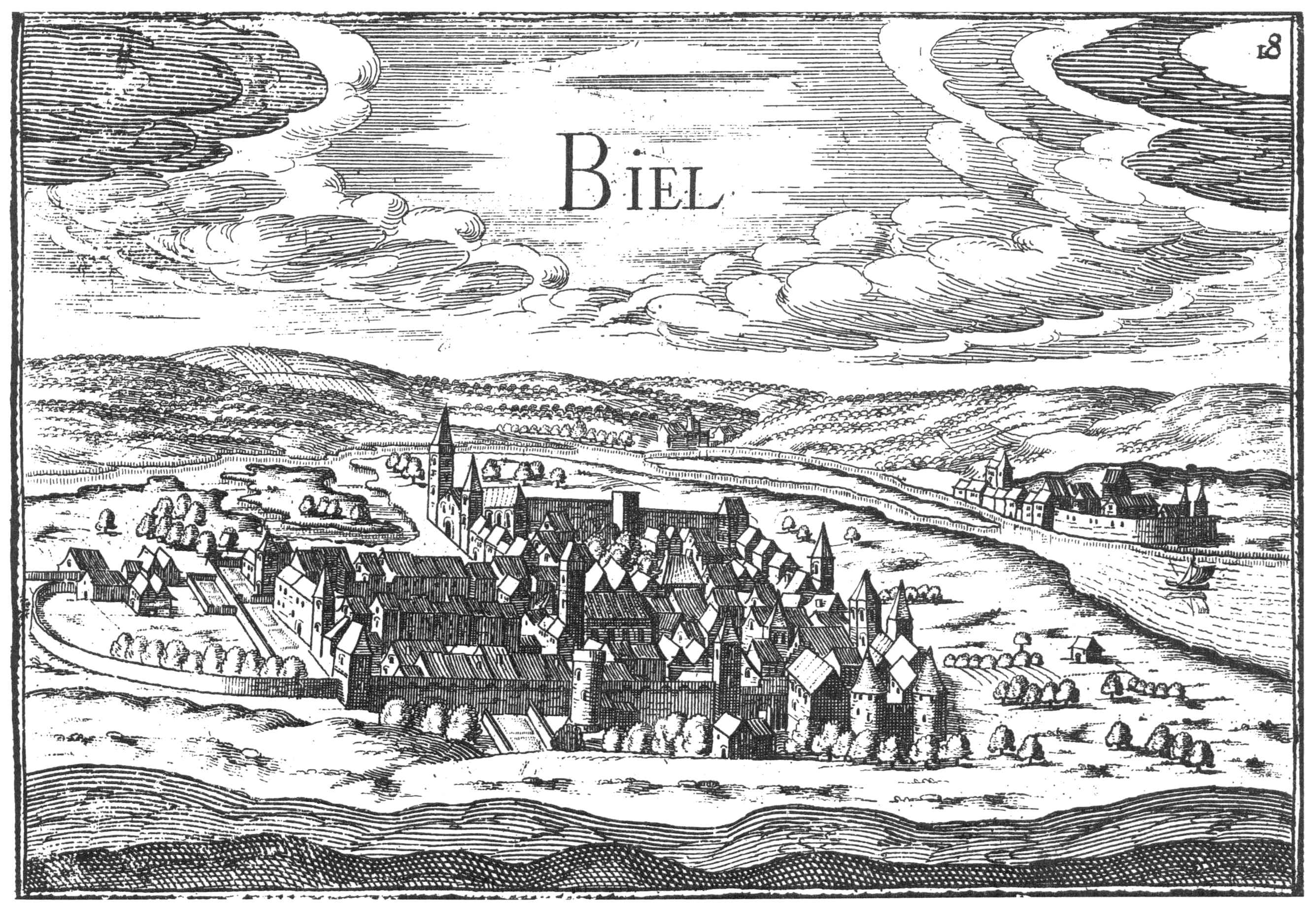
Biel/Bienne in 1546

The shoreline of Lake Biel has been inhabited since at least the Neolithic age. The remains of two neolithic settlements were found at Vingelz in 1874. The remains of the settlements became the Vingelz / Hafen archaeological site, which is now part of a UNESCO World Heritage Site. East of the Vingelz site, a late Bronze Age settlement was also discovered. After the Roman conquest, the region was part of Germania Superior. During the Roman era the Roman road from Petinesca to Pierre Pertuis or Salodurum (now Solothurn) passed through the village of Mett, which is now part of Biel/Bienne. The foundations of buildings and a 4th-century cemetery in Mett come from a late Roman or an early medieval military guard station.

A theory holds that the toponym is derived from the name of Belenus, probably from a Roman era sanctuary of that deity at a sacred spring nearby. However, no surviving records or inscriptions confirm this theory. Another theory states that the town grew up around a late Roman fortress. While no trace of the fortress has been found, the foundations of several Roman buildings have been found east of the medieval town.

The town is mentioned in 1142 as Apud Belnam, which is taken as evidence for its derivation from Belenus. In popular etymology, the name has been connected with the German name for axe (Bernese German bieli), reflected in the two crossed axes in the town's coat of arms.

=== Foundation ===
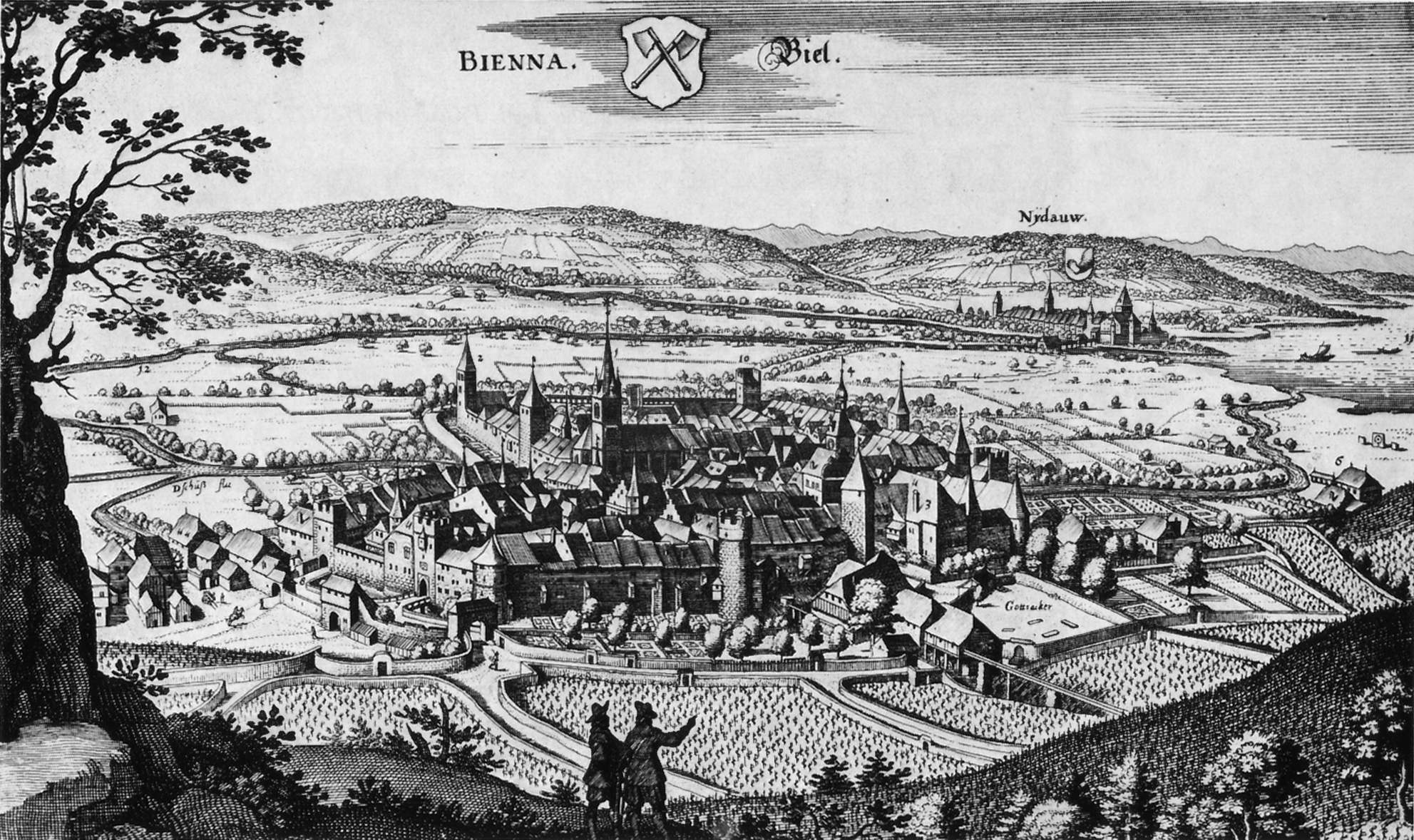
Biel/Bienne in 1642

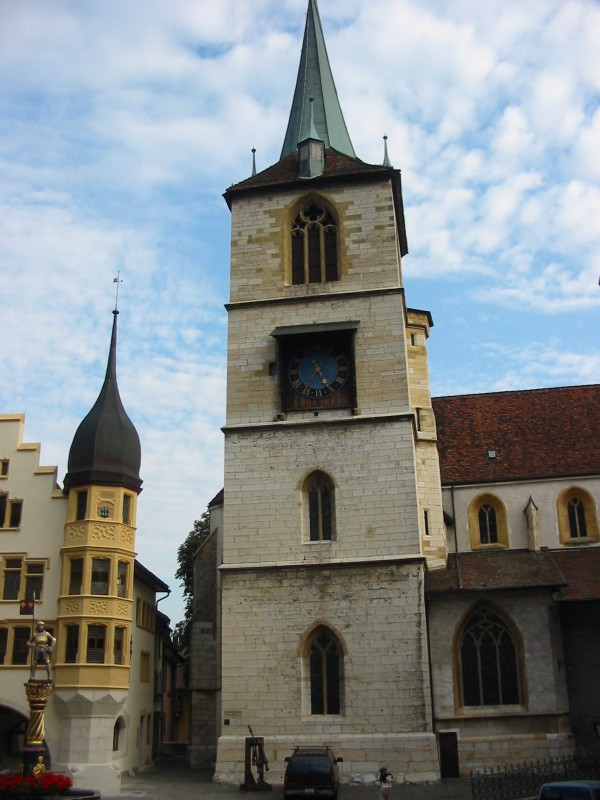
St Benedict's City Church is one of the most important late-gothic buildings in Switzerland

In the 5th century, the area was invaded by the Burgundians, and by the medieval period became part of Upper Burgundy. During the 6th or 7th century, the Germanic speaking Alamanni moved into the area around Lake Biel, creating the language boundary that exists today. By the 8th century, the German-speaking population became the majority on the east end of the lake. In 999 Rudolph III of Burgundy granted lands around Lake Biel to the Bishopric of Basel, during the formative period of the Holy Roman Empire. Through the Bishop of Basel, the Counts of Neuchâtel and later the Counts of Neuchâtel-Nidau began to exercise their power in the foothills of the Jura Mountains. In 1140 the counts built Nidau Castle in the neighboring village of Nidau to help secure their land on the eastern end of the lake. The town was probably built by the Bishop of Basel, Heinrich II von Thun, between 1225 (mention of domum de Bilne) and 1230 (mention of in urbe mea de Beuna). Biel Castle was built either shortly before or shortly after the foundation of the town, to help support Nidau Castle.

Officially, Biel remained under the jurisdiction of the Bishop of Basel throughout the 11th to 18th centuries. However, the early history of the town is filled with conflict between the town council and the Bishop's representative. In 1252, the town council partly succeeded in becoming a free imperial city. In 1275 King of Germany Rudolph of Habsburg granted Biel a town charter. The town's legal position was strengthened in 1296 when Bishop Peter Reich von Reichenstein signed an agreement with the town. This original agreement was strengthened in 1352 and remained in force until 1798.

The town's church, the Church of St. Benedict, was first mentioned in 1228. The current church was built in 1451–70 and is regarded, after Bern Cathedral, as the second most important late Gothic building in the Canton of Bern.

=== An associate of the Swiss Confederation ===
While it officially remained part of the lands of the Prince-Bishopric of Basel, starting in the 13th century Biel began making alliances with neighboring nobles and cities. In 1279 it allied with Bern. This first alliance was followed in 1311 by an alliance with Fribourg, a 1334 alliance with Solothurn, 1342 with Murten and 1395 with La Neuveville. The alliance with Bern became an eternal alliance in 1352, as Bern itself joined the Old Swiss Confederacy. Contradictory obligations to the Bishop of Basel, Jean de Vienne, and to the Imperial City of Bern led to a war in 1367. During the war, Biel was burned and the Bishop's castle was destroyed. After the extinction of the Counts of Neuchâtel-Nidau in 1375 the Bishop's power around the lake began to wane. In 1388, Bern gained control of Nidau Castle and the town of Nidau. However, the Bishop retained nominal power and influence in Biel. The two competing powers struggled for power in Biel for over 400 years and prevented the town from becoming completely independent from either powerful neighbor.

Biel was considered an associate of the Swiss Confederacy during the 15th century, and after its participation in the Burgundy Wars even came to be recognized as a full member by 1494.

Even though Biel remained nominally under the control of the Catholic Bishops of Basel, in 1528 it converted to the new Protestant faith.

=== From the French invasion to modern Biel/Bienne ===
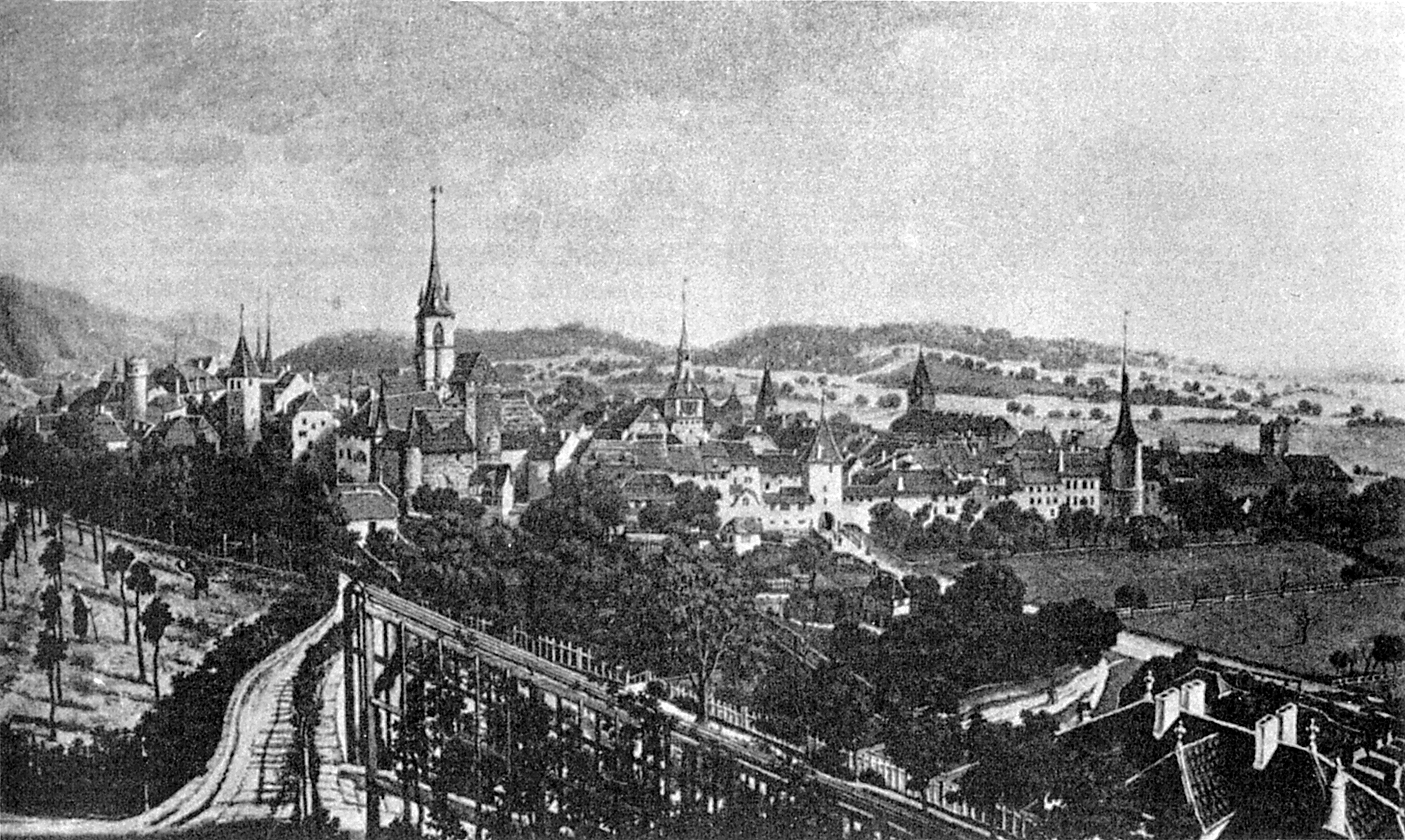
Biel/Bienne in 1805, while part of the First French Republic

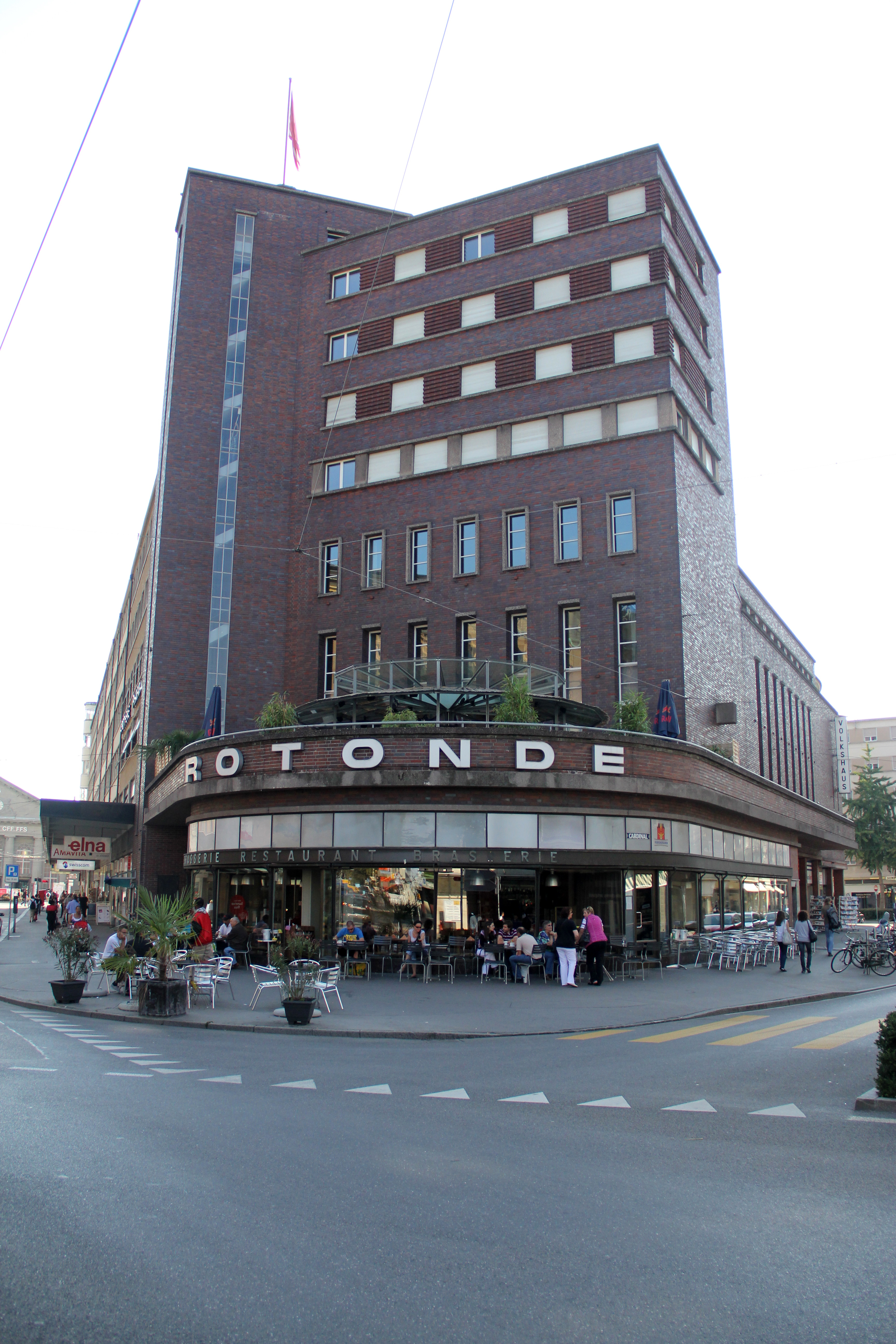
The Volkshaus/Maison du Peuple (People's House) is a symbol of the Social Democratic era of the town in the 1930s

The French Revolution changed the political situation in Biel/Bienne. In 1793, the French Revolutionary Army captured the Bishopric of Basel and brought the French into the lands near Biel. When they conquered the Moutier valley and Erguel in 1797 it brought the French practically to the gates of Biel/Bienne. On 6 February 1798, French troops marched through the open city gate while the population celebrated their arrival. Bienne and its neighboring communities were incorporated as the "Canton de Bienne" into the département du Mont-Terrible of the French First Republic. Two years later, in 1800, it went to the Département du Haut-Rhin. Under Mayor Sigmund Wildermeth (1765–1847) Biel strictly followed every dictate from Paris.

After the collapse of the French Empire, Biel sent Georg Friedrich Heilmann to the Congress of Vienna in 1814 to push for the creation of an independent Canton of Biel. However, he was unsuccessful and the Congress granted most of the territory of the Bishopric to the canton of Bern. Biel was able to resist unification until Bern agreed to retain some of Biel's historic privileges and rights. In 1815 Biel finally joined the Canton of Bern as part of the Oberamt of Nidau. The city council of Biel struggled to make it the capital of its own district. Finally in 1832 the Biel Amtsbezirk was created and Biel became the district capital. The democratic reforms of the Regeneration era helped the citizens of Biel to identify with and feel a part of the Canton of Bern.

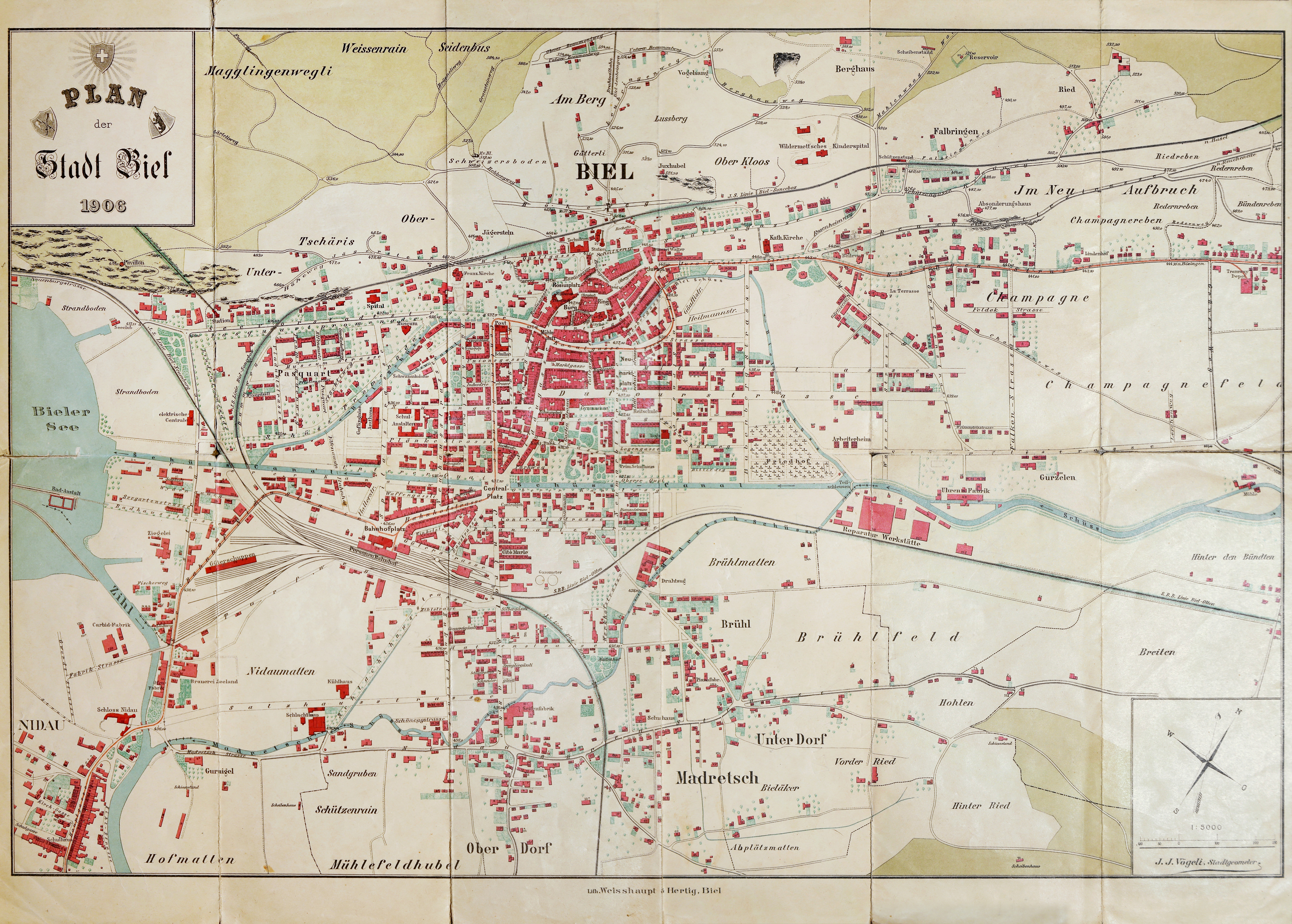
town map from 1906

By the beginning of the 20th century anarcho-syndicalist groups, which saw strikes and sabotage as legitimate means to bring about reform, began to influence the labor movement in Biel/Bienne. The first large scale strike was the construction workers strike of 1902. The following years were marked with bitterly fought labor disputes. The largest strike was the journeymen carpenters strike of 1907, which lasted almost a year. Also in 1907 labor secretary Gottfried Reimann from the Social Democratic Party was elected mayor. His election marked the first time that a Social Democrat was elected to such a powerful office in Switzerland.

The First World War meant a setback for the labor movement, even though Switzerland was not directly involved in the war. Wages were reduced significantly when the war started while inflation made everything more expensive. In July 1918, a demonstration of starving workers erupted into street riots that required military action to suppress.

In 1919 a Communist Party was founded in Biel, but it remained a minor party in the town. In 1921, the Social Democrats won a slim majority in the city councils. Under the leadership of the Social Democratic Mayor Guido Müller "Red Biel" began a series of socialist community experiments. During the 1930s the entire neighborhood around the train station was redeveloped according to the social planning theories of the era. The Volkshaus (People's House), built under the direction of Edward Lanz between 1928 and 1932, is an example of the "new building" style and a symbol of the Social Democratic era of the city.

In the years leading up to the Second World War, the Social Democrats began to lose power in the city. In the last year of the war, the Swiss Party of Labour gained nine seats on the city council and ended the Social Democrat majority. With the resignation of Mayor Müller in 1947, it would be almost thirty years (1976) before the Social Democrats had another mayor in Biel.

On the occasion of the secession of the canton of Jura in 1978, Biel had been asked to become its capital, but it remained with the canton of Bern.

The town was officially named Biel or Bienne until 2004, even though the bilingual Biel-Bienne was in common use. Since 2005, the official name has been Biel/Bienne, with forward slash.

At the beginning of the 20th century, the town's population was at 30,000 people. It doubled over the next 60 years, peaking at 65,000 in the mid-1960s. It declined gradually over the 1970s to 1990s, to below 49,000 in 2000, again rising slightly to just over 50,000 during the 2000s. Another 89,000 people live in the immediately surrounding urban agglomeration.

Aerial view by Walter Mittelholzer (1925)

== Geography and climate ==
=== Topology ===
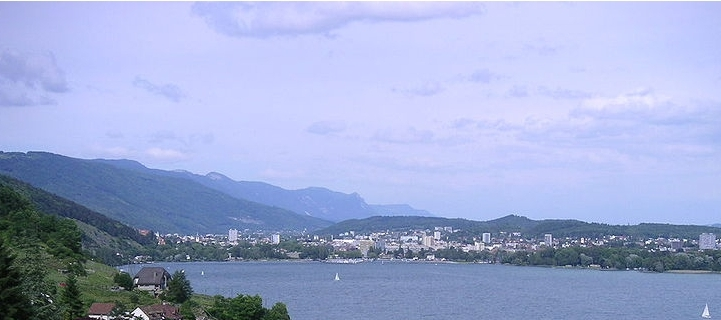
Lake Bienne with part of Biel/Bienne in the background

Biel/Bienne has an area of 21.19 km^{2} (8.18 sq mi). Of this area, 1.7 km^{2} (0.66 mi^{2}) or 8.0% is used for agricultural purposes, while 9.63 km^{2} (3.72 mi^{2}) or 45.4% is forested. Of the rest of the land, 9.65 km^{2} (3.73 mi^{2}) or 45.5% is settled (buildings or roads), 0.13 km^{2} (32 acres) or 0.6% is either rivers or lakes and 0.14 km^{2} (35 acres) or 0.7% is unproductive land.

Of the built up area, industrial buildings made up 5.1% of the total area while housing and buildings made up 21.9% and transportation infrastructure made up 12.6%. Power and water infrastructure as well as other special developed areas made up 1.7% of the area while parks, green belts and sports fields made up 4.1%. Out of the forested land, all of the forested land area is covered with heavy forests. Of the agricultural land, 4.7% is used for growing crops and 2.0% is pastures. All the water in the municipality is flowing water.

The municipality is at the southeastern foot of the Jura Mountains on the northeast end of Lake Biel. It consists of the village of Biel/Bienne, Vingelz (since 1900), Bözingen (since 1917), Madretsch and Mett (both since 1920).

On 31 December 2009 Amtsbezirk Biel, the municipality's former district, was dissolved. On the following day, 1 January 2010, it joined the newly created Verwaltungskreis Biel/Bienne. It remained the capital of the new Verwaltungskreis.

=== Climate ===
Climate data for Biel/Bienne (1981–2010)
Month	Jan	Feb	Mar	Apr	May	Jun	Jul	Aug	Sep	Oct	Nov	Dec	Year
Mean daily maximum °C (°F)	3.7 (38.7)	5.6 (42.1)	10.7 (51.3)	14.9 (58.8)	19.6 (67.3)	22.9 (73.2)	25.6 (78.1)	25.0 (77.0)	20.5 (68.9)	14.7 (58.5)	8.0 (46.4)	4.7 (40.5)	14.7 (58.5)
Daily mean °C (°F)	0.7 (33.3)	1.6 (34.9)	5.5 (41.9)	9.5 (49.1)	14.0 (57.2)	17.4 (63.3)	19.7 (67.5)	18.9 (66.0)	14.8 (58.6)	10.3 (50.5)	4.8 (40.6)	1.8 (35.2)	9.9 (49.8)
Mean daily minimum °C (°F)	−1.5 (29.3)	−1.4 (29.5)	1.6 (34.9)	4.7 (40.5)	9.1 (48.4)	12.4 (54.3)	14.4 (57.9)	14.0 (57.2)	10.6 (51.1)	7.1 (44.8)	2.2 (36.0)	−0.4 (31.3)	6.1 (43.0)
Average precipitation mm (inches)	101 (4.0)	88 (3.5)	89 (3.5)	79 (3.1)	100 (3.9)	100 (3.9)	102 (4.0)	113 (4.4)	97 (3.8)	104 (4.1)	98 (3.9)	117 (4.6)	1,187 (46.7)
Average snowfall cm (inches)	14.8 (5.8)	13.2 (5.2)	5.6 (2.2)	0.8 (0.3)	0 (0)	0 (0)	0 (0)	0 (0)	0 (0)	0 (0)	3.7 (1.5)	13.6 (5.4)	51.7 (20.4)
Average precipitation days (≥ 1.0 mm)	10.7	10.0	10.7	10.2	12.2	10.8	10.6	10.6	8.8	10.8	10.5	11.5	127.4
Average snowy days (≥ 1.0 cm)	4.1	3.4	1.8	0.3	0	0	0	0	0	0	1	2.9	13.5
Average relative humidity (%)	85	80	73	69	70	69	67	71	76	83	84	85	76
Source: MeteoSwiss

== Politics ==
=== Coat of arms ===
The blazon of the municipal coat of arms is Gules two Axes Argent in saltire.

=== Government ===
The Municipal Council (fr: Conseil municipal, de: Gemeinderat) constitutes the executive government of the City of Biel/Bienne and operates as a collegiate authority. It is composed of five councilors (French: Conseiller municipal/ Conseillère municipale, German: Gemeinderat/ Gemeinderätin), each presiding over a directorate. The president of the presidential directorate acts as mayor (fr: Maire, de: Stadtpräsident). In the mandate period 2025–2028 (législature, Legislatur) the Municipal Council is presided by Maire/ Stadtpräsidentin Glenda Gonzalez Bassi. Departmental tasks, coordination measures and implementation of laws decreed by the City Council (parliament) are carried by the Municipal Council. The regular election of the Municipal Council by any inhabitant valid to vote is held every four years. Any resident of Biel/Bienne allowed to vote can be elected as a member of the Municipal Council. The current mandate period is from 1 January 2024 to 31 December 2027. The mayor is elected as such by public election by means of a system of Majorz, while the heads of the other directorates are assigned by the collegiate. The delegates are selected by means of a system of Proporz.

As of 2025, Biel/Bienne's Municipal Council is made up of two representatives of the PSR/SP (Social Democratic Party, of whom one is also the mayor), one member of the Grünes Bündnis (GB) (Green Party), one of the PRR (Les Radicaux Romands), and one of the UDC/SVP (Swiss People's Party), giving the left parties a majority of three out of five seats. The last regular election was held on 22 September 2024. Glenda Gonzalez Bassi was elected Mayor in the runoff election on 24 November 2024 and took office on 1 January 2025 as the first woman to hold the office of Mayor of Biel/Bienne.

Le Conseil municipal of Biel/Bienne
Municipal Councillor (Conseiller communal/ Conseillère communale, Stadtrat/ Stadträtin)	Party	Head of Directorate (Directeur/Directrice de, Direktor/Direktorin, since) of	elected since	Native language
Glenda Gonzalez Bassi (Note: Mayor (fr: Maire, de: Stadtpräsidentin))	PSR	Mayor's Office (mairie/ Präsidialdirektion, 2025)	2020	FR
Natasha Pittet (Note: Vice-Mayor (fr: vice-président, de: Vize-Stadtpräsidentin))	PRR	Social Services and Security (Direction de l'action sociale et de la sécurité/ Direktion Soziales und Sicherheit, 2023)	2023	FR
Beat Feurer	SVP	Finance (Direction des finances/ Finanzdirektion, 2025)	2012	DE
Anna Tanner	PS	Education, Culture, and Sports (Direction de la formation, de la culture et du sport/ Direktion Bildung, Kultur und Sport, 2025)	2020	DE
Lena Frank	GB	Civil Engineering and Construction, Energy, and Environmental Sustainability (Direction des travaux publics, de l'énergie et de l'environnement/ Direktion Bau, Energie und Umwelt, 2021)	2020	DE

Julien Steiner is Town Chancellor (chancelier municipale/ Stadtschreiber) since 2025, and Kathrin Affolter is Deputy Town Chancellor (vice-chancelière/ Vize-Stadtschreiberin) since 2025 for the Municipal Council.

=== Parliament ===
The Conseil de ville/Stadtrat of Biel/Bienne for the mandate period of 2025–2028
1. POP/PdA (3.30%)
2. JS/JUSO (3.30%)
3. SP (16.7%)
4. PSR (11.7%)
5. Les Verts/Grüne (15.0%)
6. AvenirBiel (6.70%)
7. pvl/glp (8.30%)
8. PEV/EVP (3.30%)
9. FDP (8.30%)
10. PRR (6.70%)
11. UDC/SVP/DE (15.0%)
12. UDF/EDU (1.70%)

The City Council (fr: Conseil de ville, de: Stadtrat), the city parliament, holds legislative power. It is made up of 60 members, with elections held every four years. The City Council decrees regulations and by-laws that are executed by the Municipal Council and the administration. The delegates are selected by means of a system of proportional representation.

The sessions of the City Council are public. Unlike members of the Municipal Council, members of the City Council are not politicians by profession, and they are paid a fee based on their attendance. Any resident of Biel/Bienne allowed to vote can be elected as a member of the City Council. The Parliament holds its meetings in the Stadtratssaal.

The last regular election of the City Council was held on 22 September 2024 for the mandate period (la législature) from 2025 to 2028. The voter turnout was 34.67%.

Currently the City Council consist of 19 members of the Social Democratic Party (PSR/SP) including 7 members of the French branch Parti Socialiste Romand (PSR) and 2 members of its junior parties JUSO/JS, 8 members of the Liberals (PRR/FDP) including 4 members of its French branch Parti Radical Romand (PRR), 9 members of the Swiss People's Party (UDC/SVP), 9 members of the Green Party (LV/Grüne), 4 Green Liberal Party (PVL/GLP), 4 members of the alliance called Zukunft Biel Mitte / Avenir Bienne Centre, 2 members of the Evangelical People's Party (PEV/EVP), 2 members of the Swiss Party of Labour (POP/PdA), and one member of the Federal Democratic Union (UDF/EDU).

=== Elections ===
==== National Council ====
In the 2019 federal election for the Swiss National Council the most popular party was the SP/PS which received 26.4% (-5.7) of the vote. The next five most popular parties were the Green Party (24.1%, +10.2), the SVP/UDC (15.4%, -6.6), the glp/pvl (8.9%, +3.3), PLR (7.9%, -1.5), and the BDP/PBD (3.9%, -3.1). In the federal election a total of 11,096 votes were cast, and the voter turnout was 35.9%.

In the 2015 federal election the most popular party was the SP/PS which received 32.0% (+0.8) of the vote. The next five most popular parties were the SVP/UDC (22.0%, +2.1), the Green Party (13.9%, -0.8), PLR/FDP (9.4%, +1.4), the glp/pvl (8.9%, +3.3), and the BDP/PBD (7.0%). In the federal election a total of xxx votes were cast, and the voter turnout was 36.9%.

In the 2011 federal election the most popular party was the SP/PS which received 31.2% of the vote. The next three most popular parties were the SVP/UDC (19.9%), the Green Party (14.7%) and the PLR/FDP (8.8%). In the federal election, a total of 12,363 votes were cast, and the voter turnout was 39.0%.

=== International relations ===
Biel/Bienne is twinned with:

- Iserlohn, Germany (since 1959)

== Demographics ==
=== Population ===
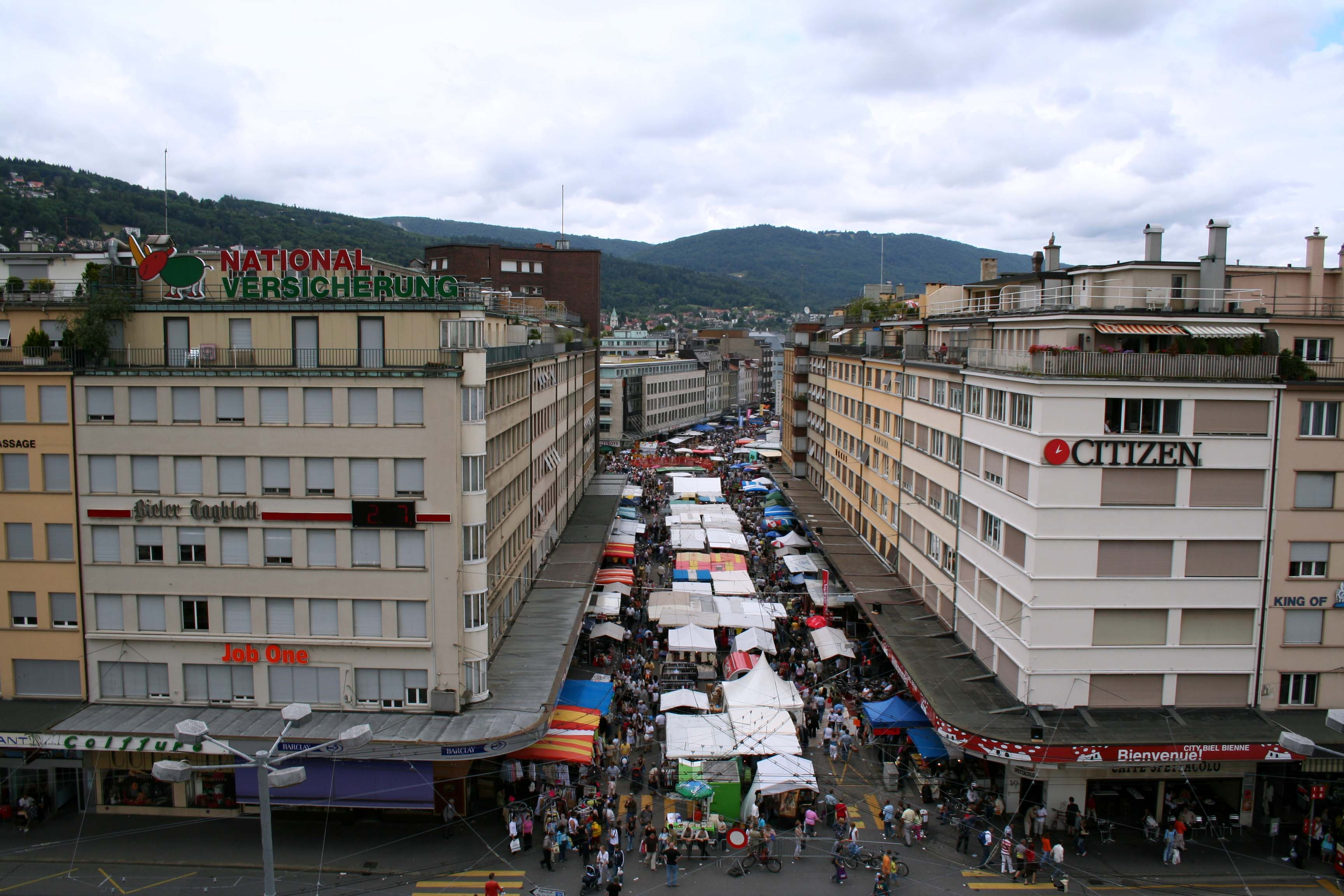
Apartments and street market near the train station

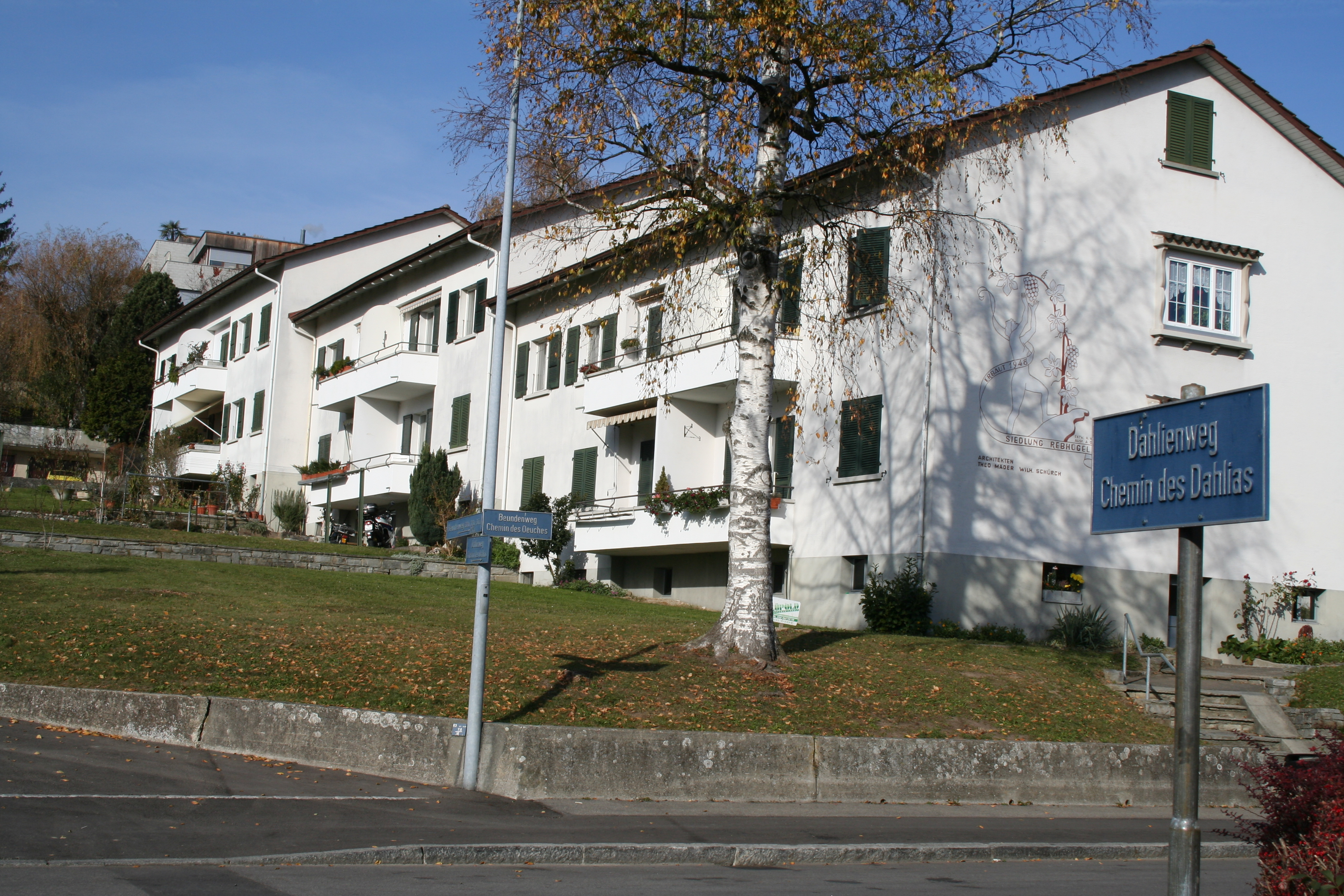
Small apartments in the Mösliquartier/Petit-Marais

Biel/Bienne has a population (as of December 2020) of 55,206. As of 2010, 28.1% of the population are resident foreign nationals. Over the last 10 years (2000–2010) the population has changed at a rate of 3.8%. Migration accounted for 7.8%, while births and deaths accounted for −1.4%.

Of the population in the municipality, 15,339 or about 31.5% were born in Biel/Bienne and lived there in 2000. There were 8,990 or 18.5% who were born in the same canton, while 9,170 or 18.8% were born somewhere else in Switzerland, and 12,244 or 25.2% were born outside of Switzerland.

As of 2010, children and teenagers (0–19 years old) make up 18.8% of the population, while adults (20–64 years old) make up 61.9% and seniors (over 64 years old) make up 19.3%.

As of 2000, there were 19,980 people who were single and never married in the municipality. There were 21,188 married individuals, 3,727 widows or widowers and 3,760 individuals who are divorced.

As of 2000, there were 11,014 households that consist of only one person and 797 households with five or more people. In 2000, a total of 23,367 apartments (86.8% of the total) were permanently occupied, while 2,169 apartments (8.1%) were seasonally occupied and 1,398 apartments (5.2%) were empty. As of 2010, the construction rate of new housing units was 3.2 new units per 1000 residents.

As of 2003 the average price to rent an average apartment in Biel/Bienne was 935.83 Swiss francs (CHF) per month. The average rate for a one-room apartment was 463.73 CHF, a two-room apartment was about 706.49 CHF, a three-room apartment was about 846.98 CHF and a six or more room apartment cost an average of 1749.16 CHF. The average apartment price in Biel/Bienne was 83.9% of the national average of 1116 CHF. The vacancy rate for the municipality, in 2011, was 2%.

=== Historic population ===
The historical population is given in the following chart:

Historic Population Data
Year	Total Population	German Speaking	French Speaking	Catholic	Protestant	Christian Catholic	Jewish	Other religions	No religion given	Swiss	Non-Swiss
1770	1,698										
1818	3,589										
1850	5,609									5,268	341
1880	16,579	13,253	3,207	1,675	14,620		240	77		15,323	1,289
1910	32,136	22,017	9,209	4,840	26,366		413	517		28,723	3,413
1930	37,726	24,946	11,673	6,031	30,750		310	635		35,588	2,338
1950	48,342	32,188	14,598	8,659	38,314	572	268	529		46,232	2,110
1970	64,333	36,354	17,396	22,745	40,032	282	178	1,096		52,148	12,185
1990	51,893	27,510	15,906	17,857	26,123	116	69	7,728	3,959	40,576	11,317

=== Language ===
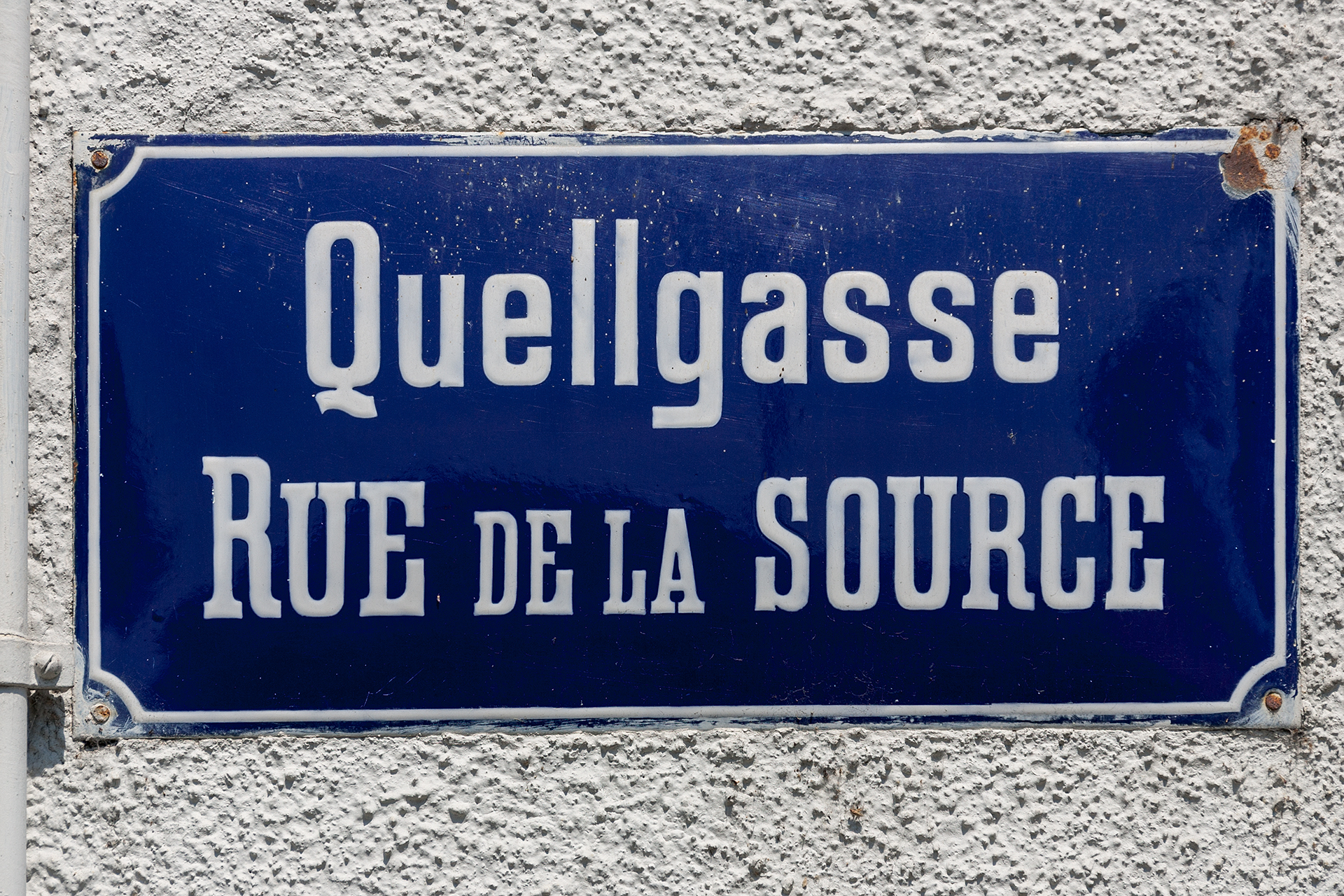
Bilingual street sign

In 2000, a majority of the population spoke German (26,957 or 55.4%) as their first language. French was the second most common (13,695 or 28.1%) and Italian was third (2,925 or 6.0%). There were 37 people who spoke Romansh. German and French are both official languages of Biel/Bienne, which is the largest bilingual city in Switzerland.

In 2020, when asked specifically about the two official languages, 32,154 residents (56.8% of the population) mentioned German as their principal language, while 24,376 (43.2%) mentioned French.

In recent years the city has used its linguistic assets as an economic advantage, becoming the Swiss City of Communication. Several call centres have been created in or around Biel, in addition to the traditional businesses established in the city and surrounding area, which have always exported most of their production worldwide.

=== Religion ===
According to the 2000 census, 19,191 people or 39.4% of the total population, belonged to the Swiss Reformed Church, while 14,241 or 29.3% were Roman Catholic. Of the rest of the population, there were 613 members of an Orthodox church (or about 1.26% of the population), there were 87 individuals (or about 0.18% of the population) who belonged to the Christian Catholic Church, and there were 2,870 individuals (or about 5.90% of the population) who belonged to another Christian church. There were 61 individuals (or about 0.13% of the population) who were Jewish, and 3,156 (or about 6.49% of the population) who were Muslim. There were 329 individuals who were Buddhist, 235 individuals who were Hindu and 68 individuals who belonged to another church. 6,012 (or about 12.36% of the population) belonged to no church, are agnostic or atheist, and 3,180 individuals (or about 6.54% of the population) did not answer the question.

== Tourism ==
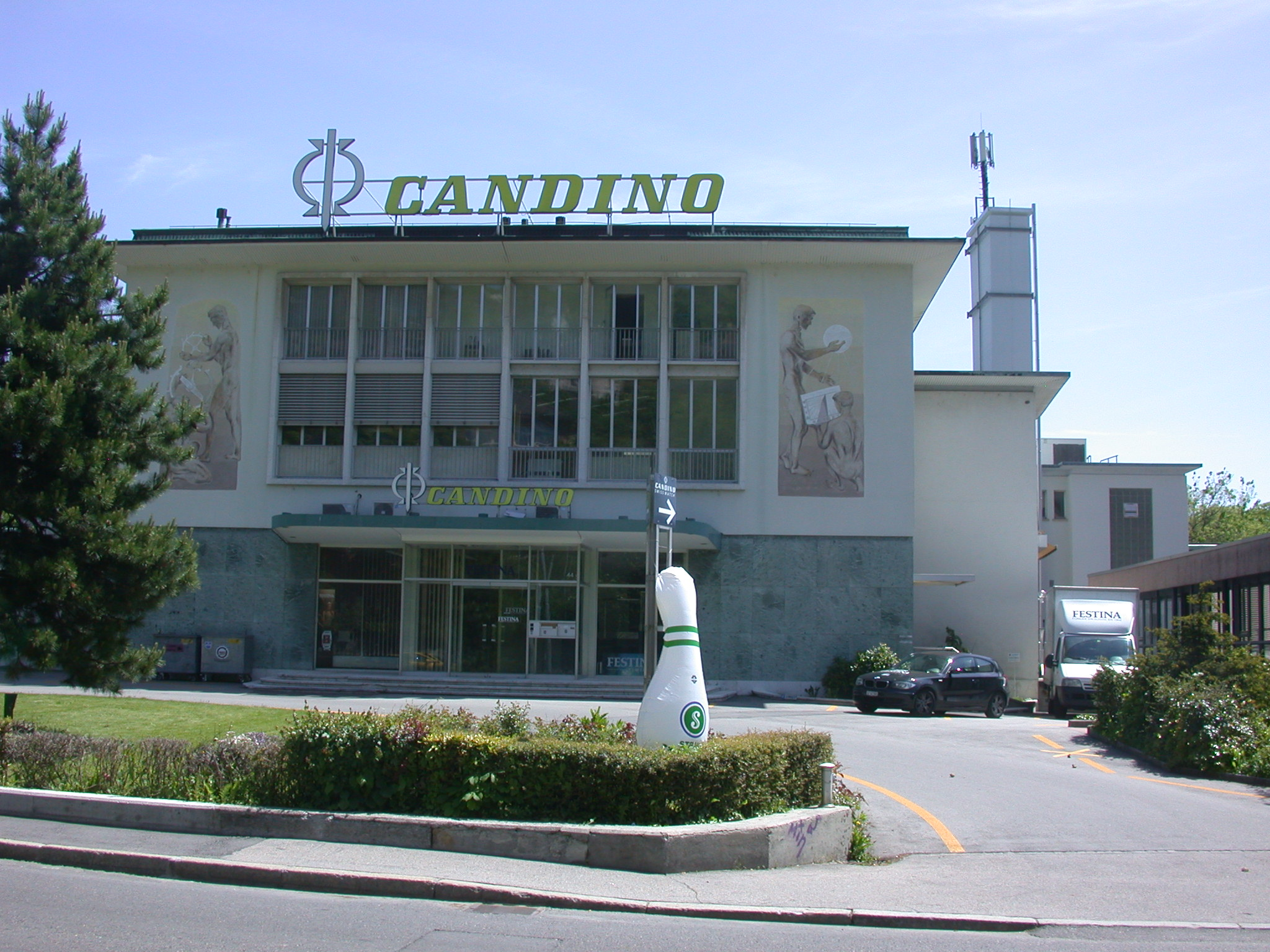
Candino building in Biel/Bienne

Biel/Bienne is located near the watch-making cities of La Chaux-de-Fonds and Le Locle, which together form a UNESCO World Heritage Site. The city is home to numerous watchmaking factories. The Swatch Group has its worldwide headquarters in the old ASUAG building. The old city of Biel/Bienne includes a 15th-century Gothic church, guild halls, and fountains. Outside the old city, the Biel "Cultural Quarter" is home to the Neuhaus and Schwab Museums and the CentrePasquArt.

The Jura mountains are north of the town and two funicular railways, the Bienne–Evilard Funicular and the Biel–Magglingen Funicular, link the city with the foothills. North-east of the town, the steep gorge of Taubenloch is a popular place to visit. West of the city is Lake Biel which is lined with parks and the town's harbor.

In 2016 a total of 50,646 visitors spent 87,937 lodging nights in Biel/Bienne.

=== Heritage sites of national significance ===
The Alte Krone/La vieille Couronne, the artist's studio Atelier Robert, the former Rockhall Manor, the main train station, the Jordi-Kocher House, the Catholic parish Church of St. Maria Immaculata, the Kongresshaus/Palais des Congrès (Convention Center), the Kontrollgebäude at Zentralstrasse 49 / Oberer Quai 2, the Neuhaus Museum with the Robert Foundation Collection, the Schwab Museum, the Swiss Reformed City Church, the administration building and montage hall for General Motors, the Volkshaus Building and the Waldleute Zunft Building are listed as Swiss heritage site of national significance. The entire town of Biel/Bienne and the Taubenlochschlucht canyon are both part of the Inventory of Swiss Heritage Sites.

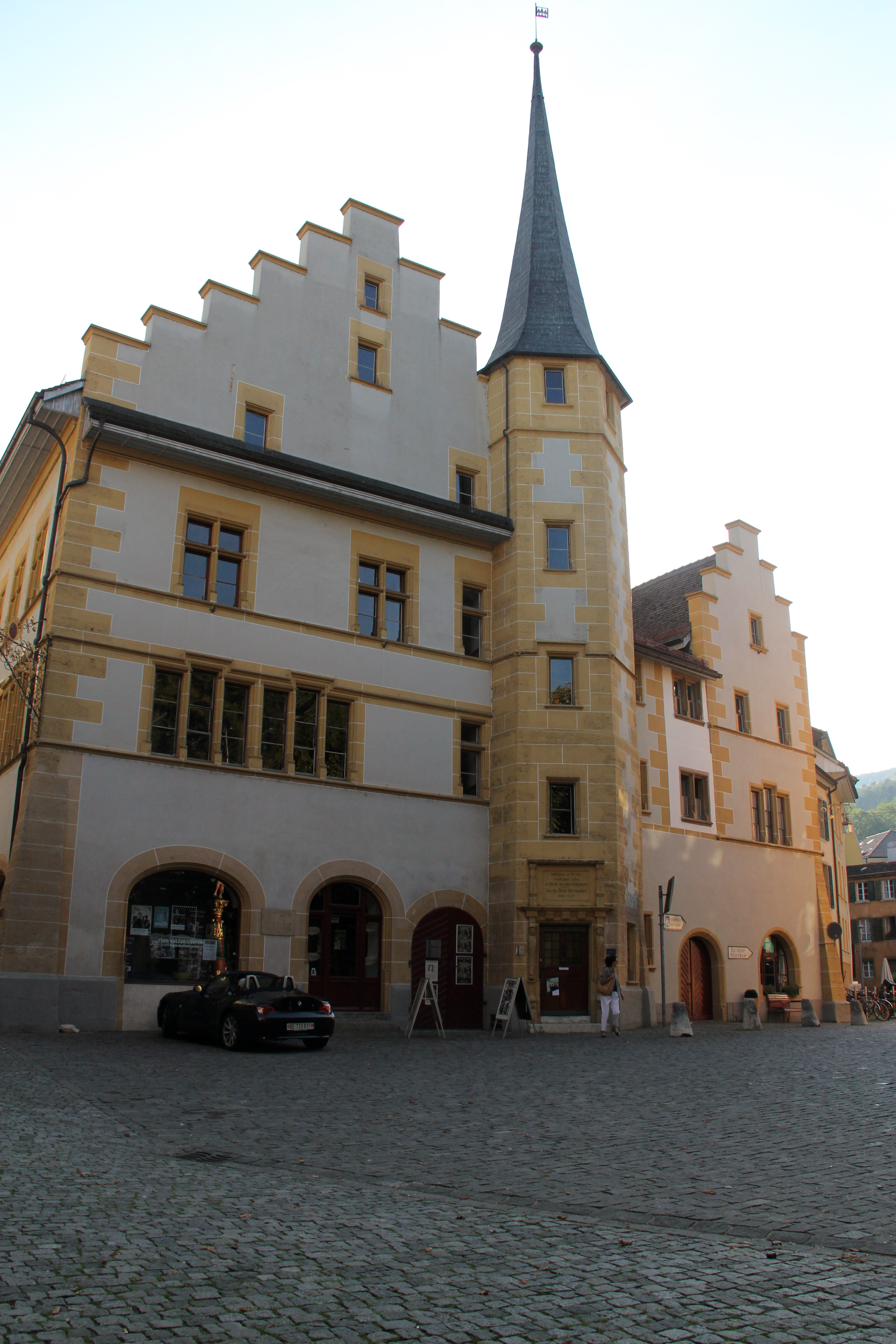
Alte Krone, Vieille Couronne

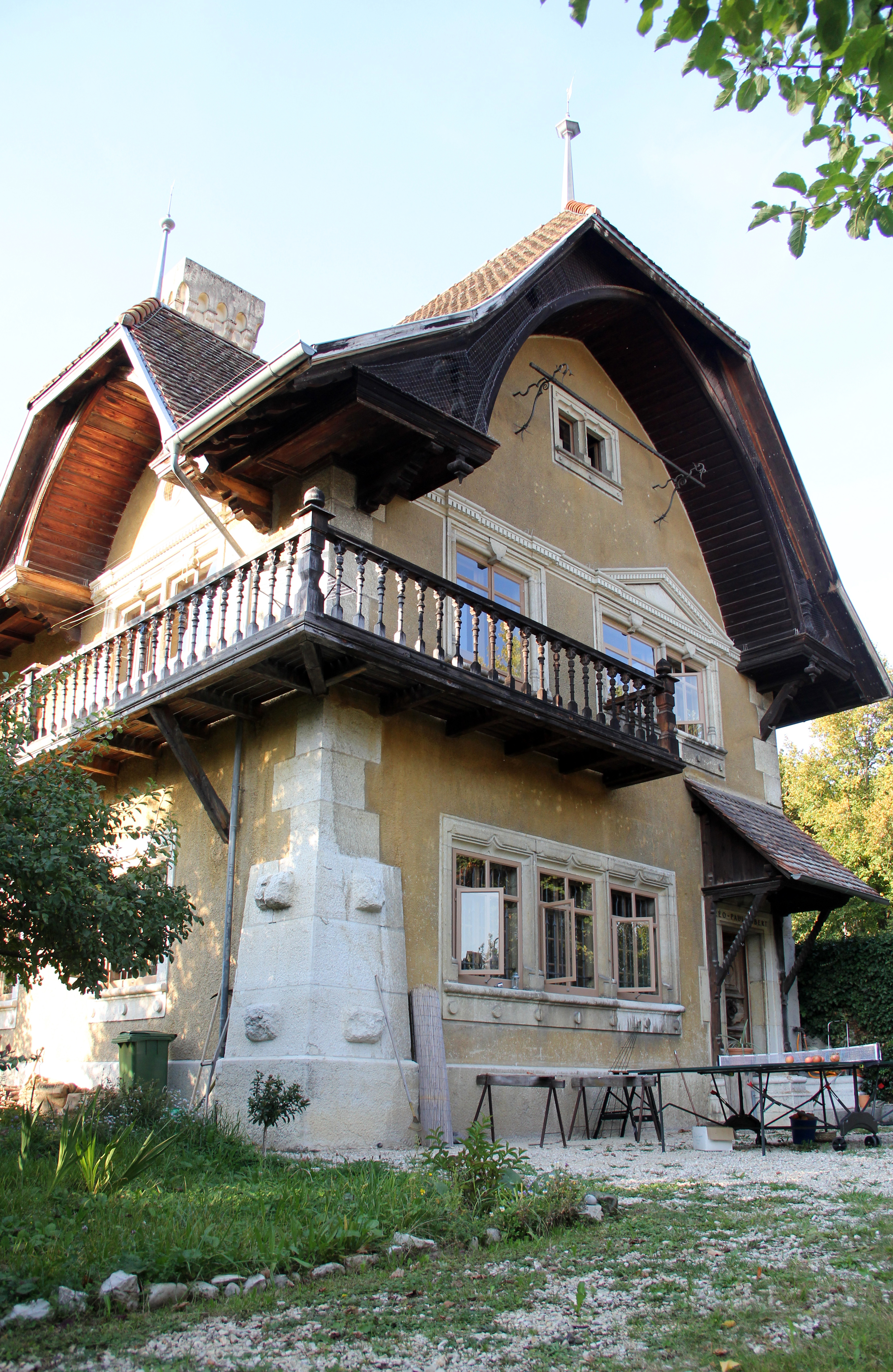
Atelier Robert

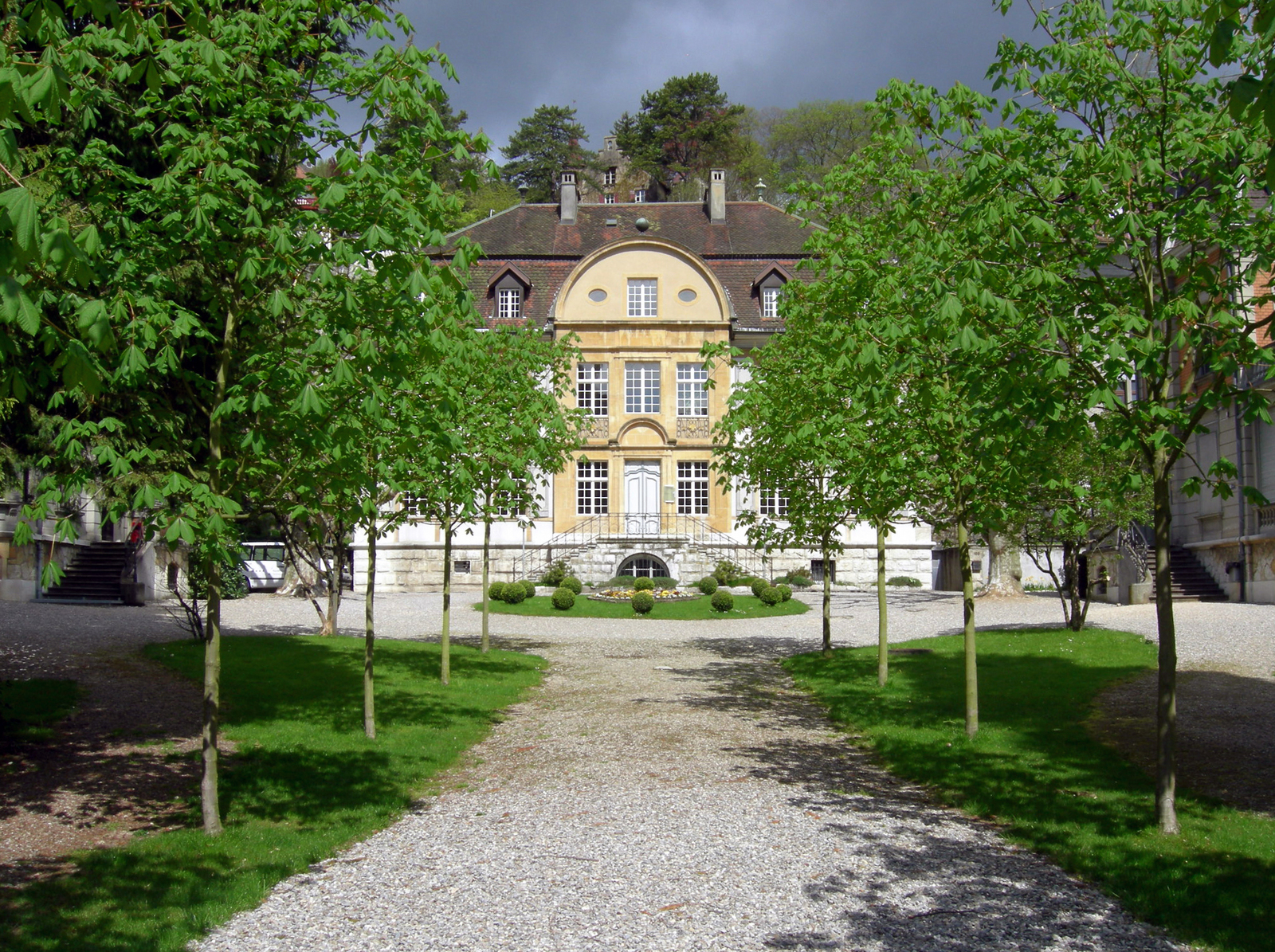
The former Rockhall Manor building

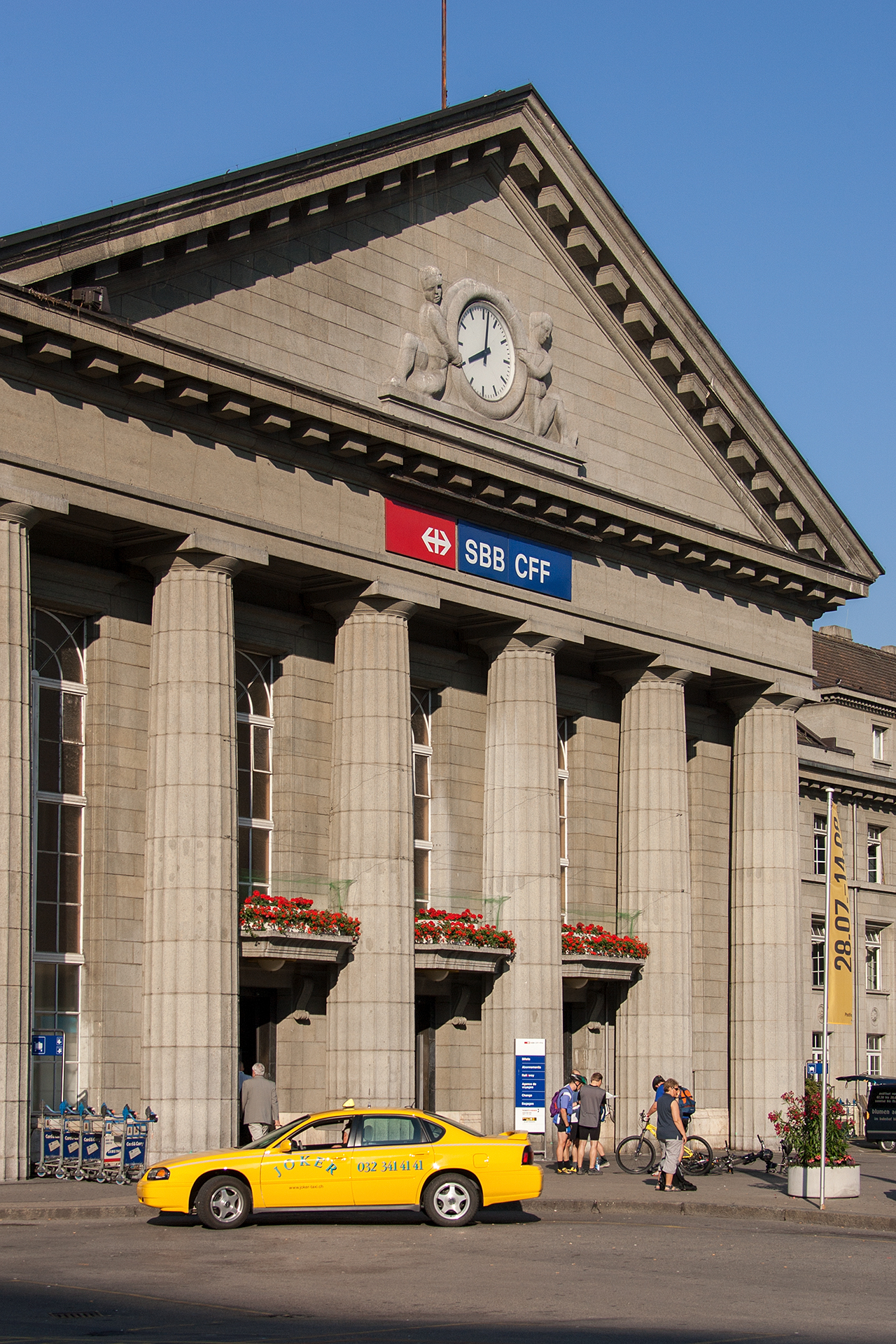
Main Train Station

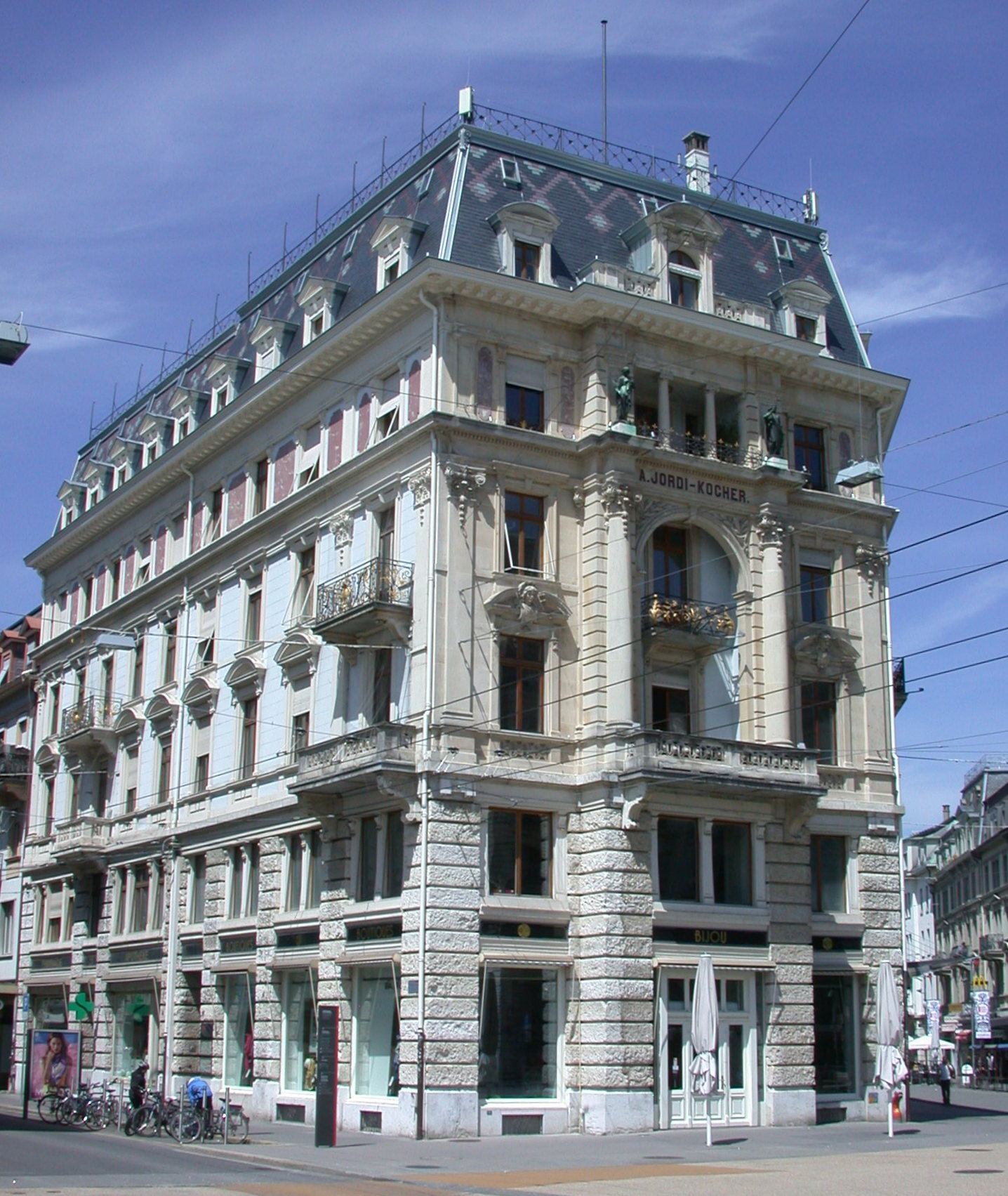
Jordi-Kocher House

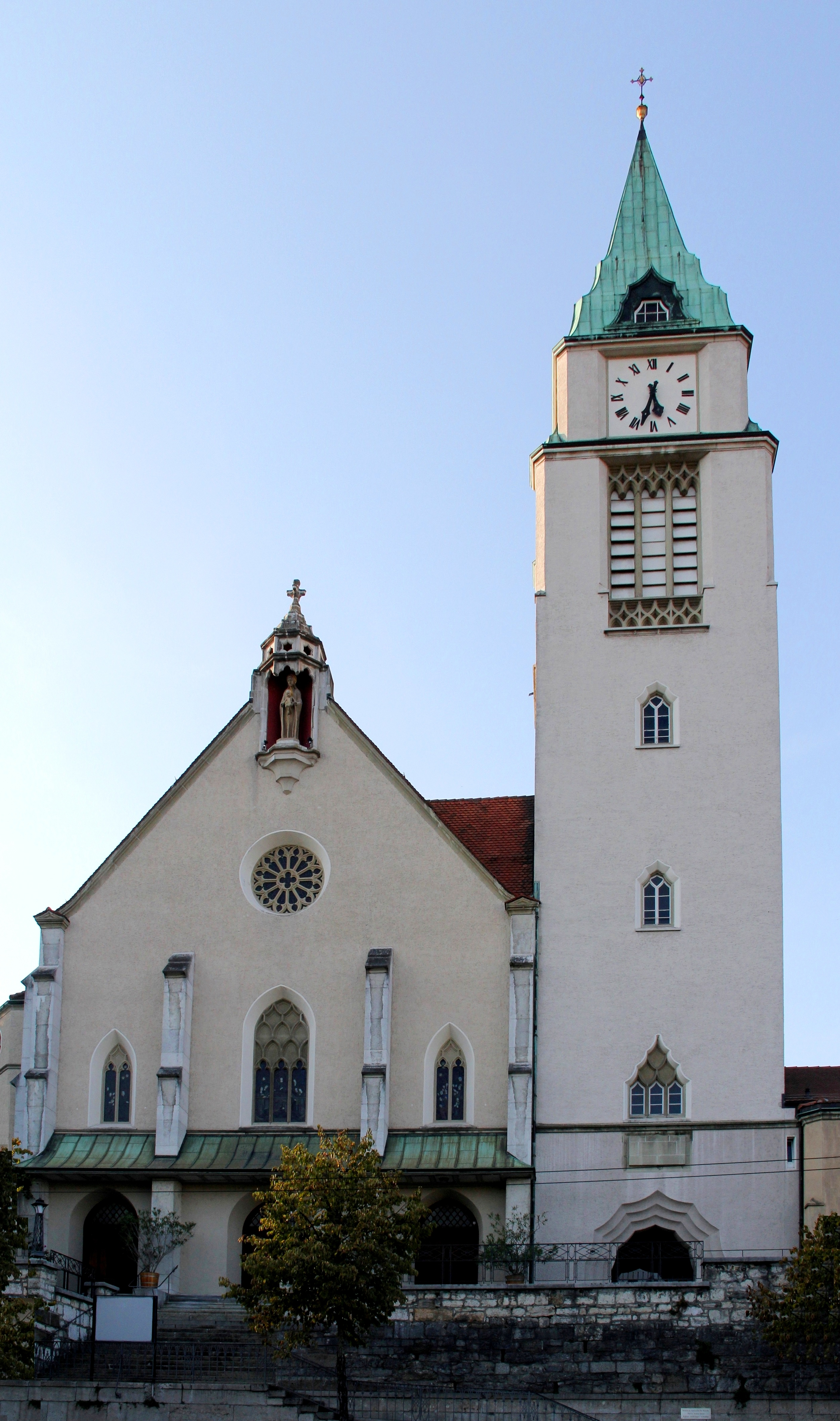
Catholic parish church of St. Maria Immaculata

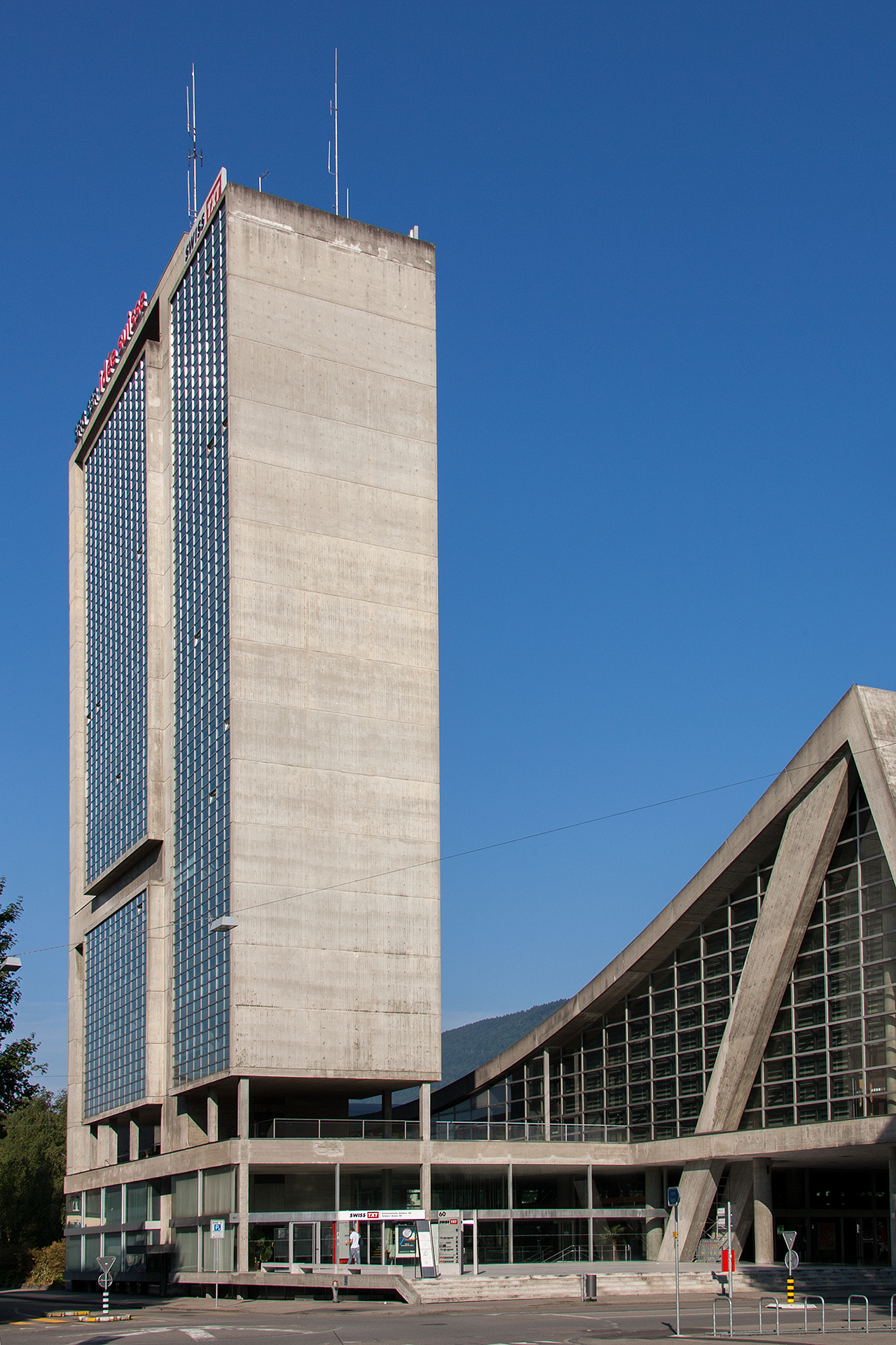
Kongresshaus, Palais des congrès, (Convention Center)

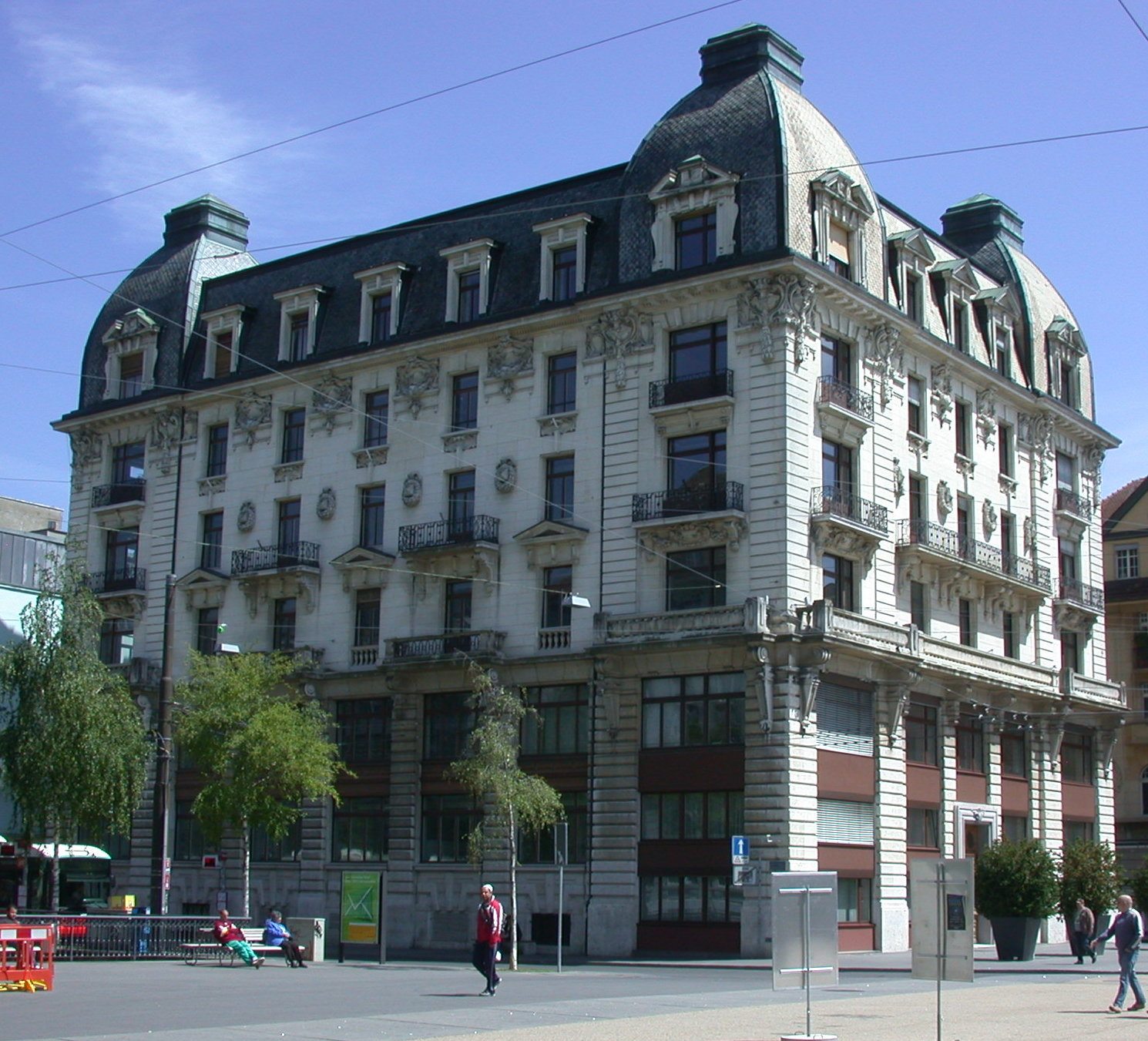
Kontrollgebäude at Zentralstrasse 49 / Oberer Quai 2

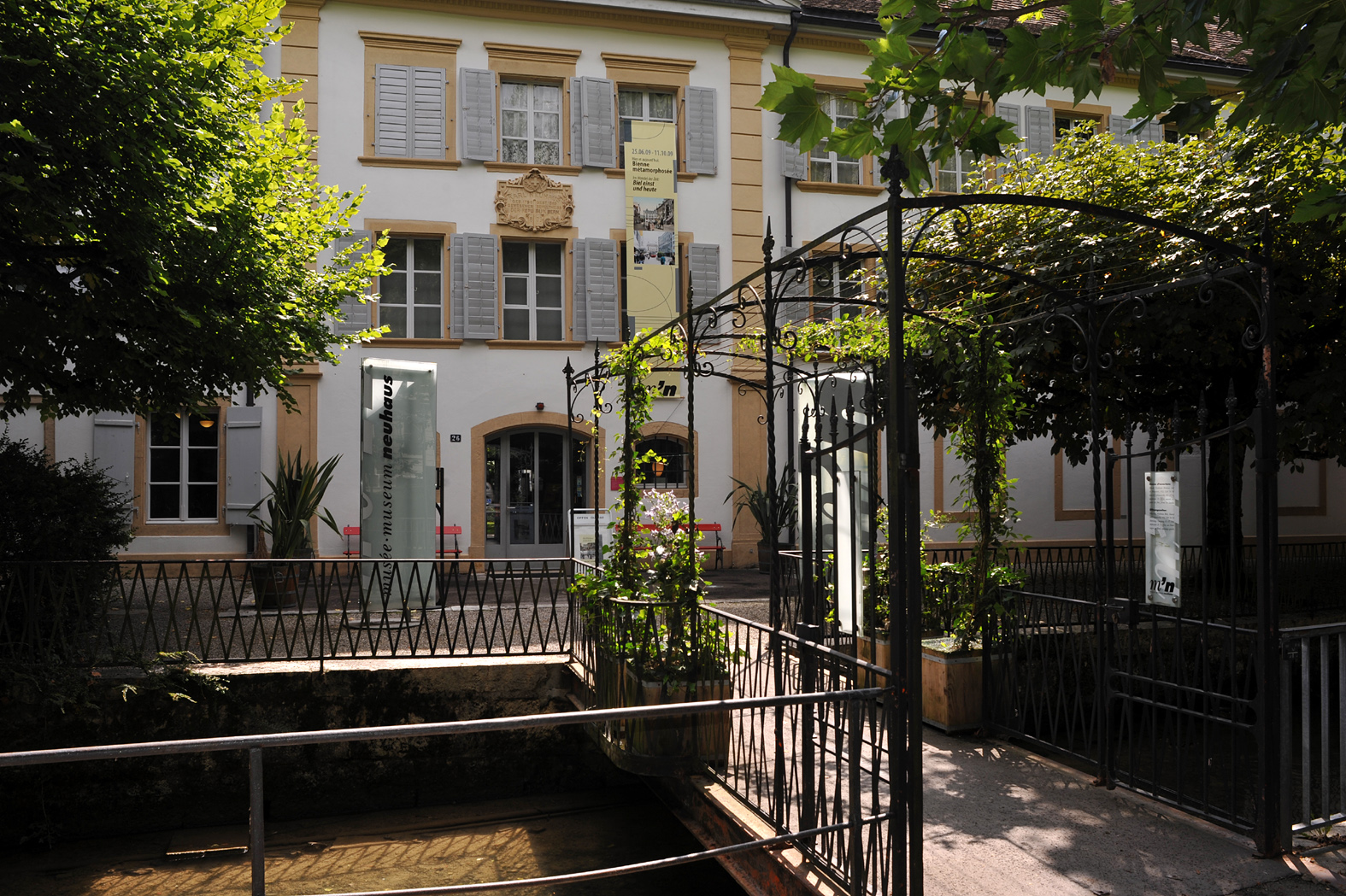
Museum Neuhaus

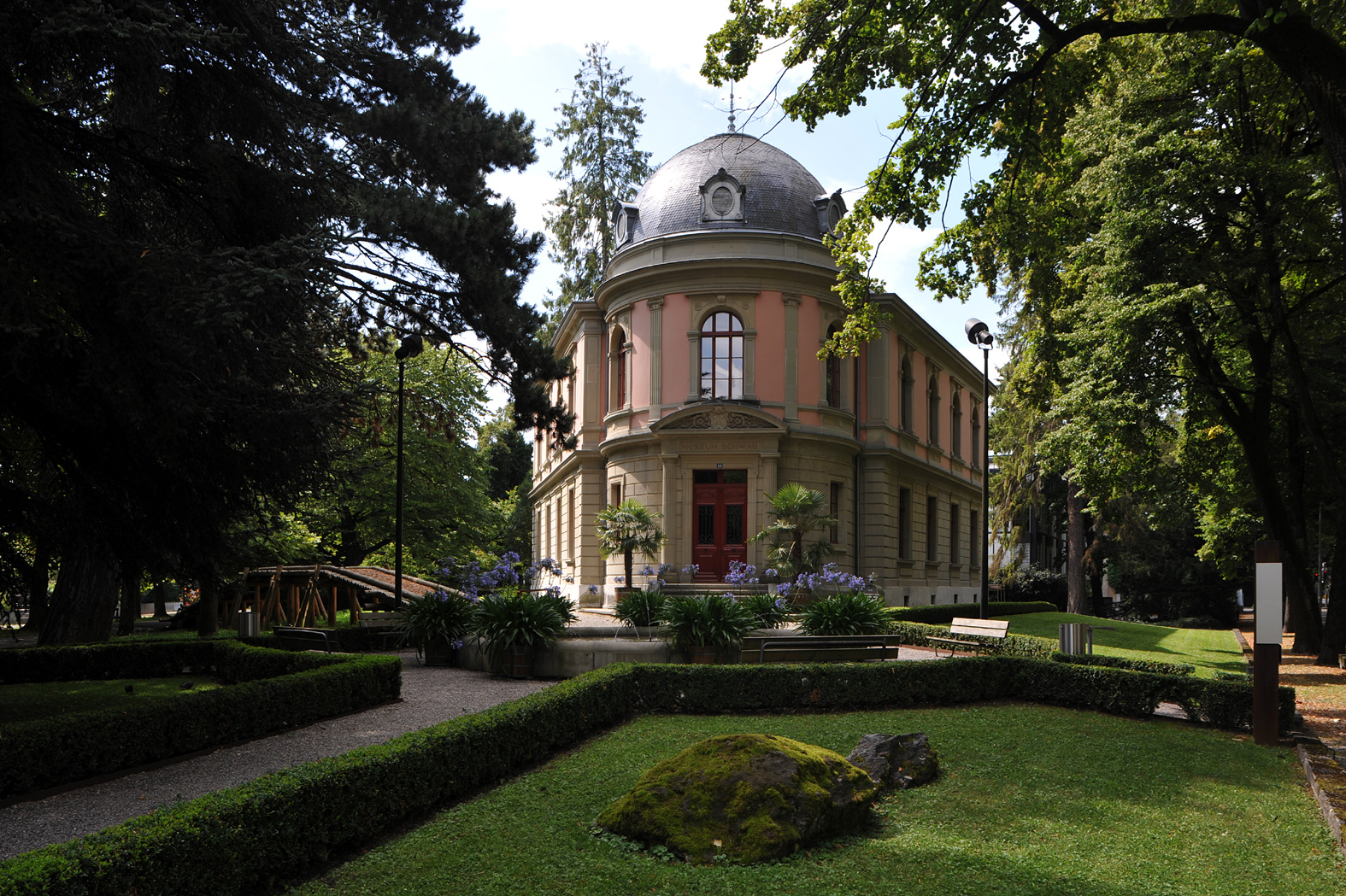
Museum Schwab

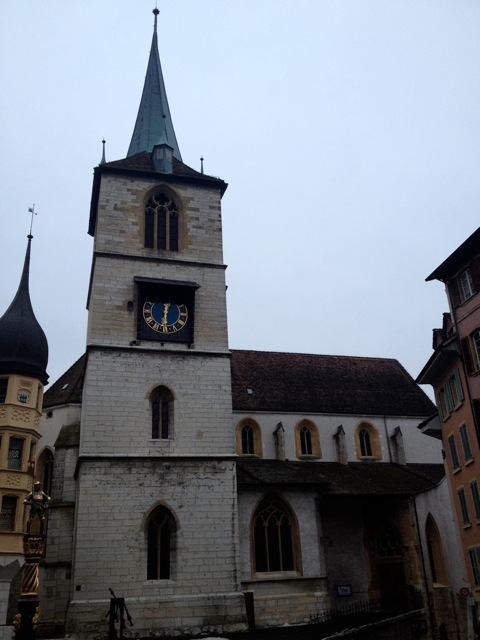
Swiss Reformed City Church

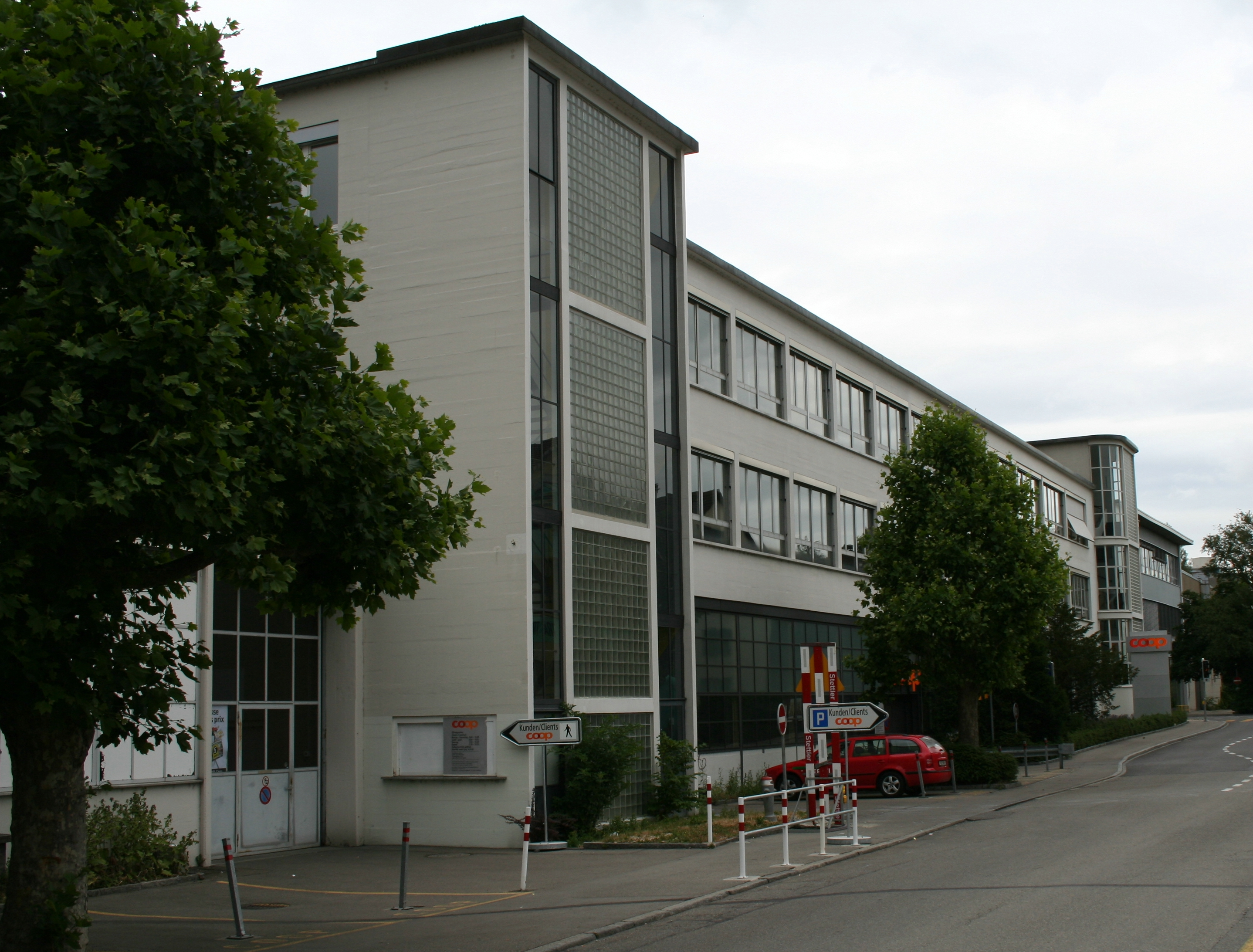
Administration Building and Montage Hall for General Motors

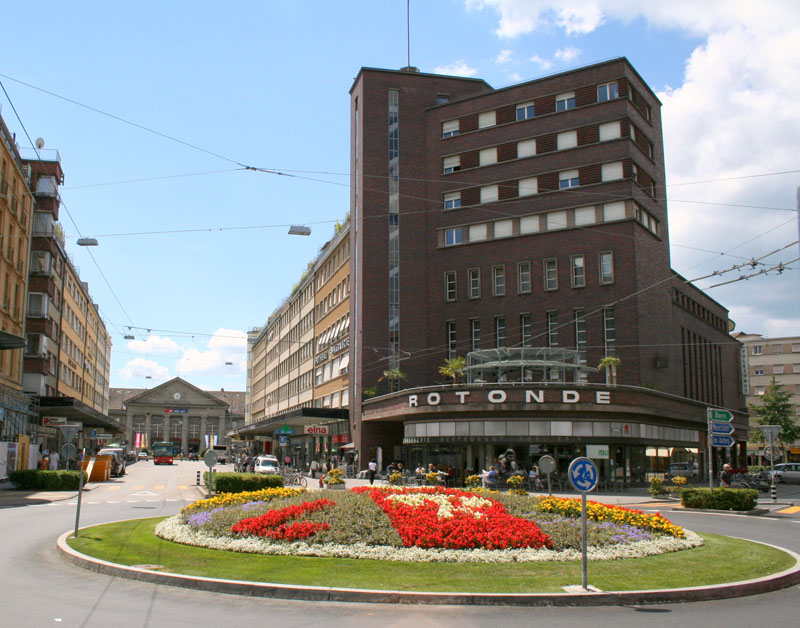
Volkshaus, Maison du Peuple Building

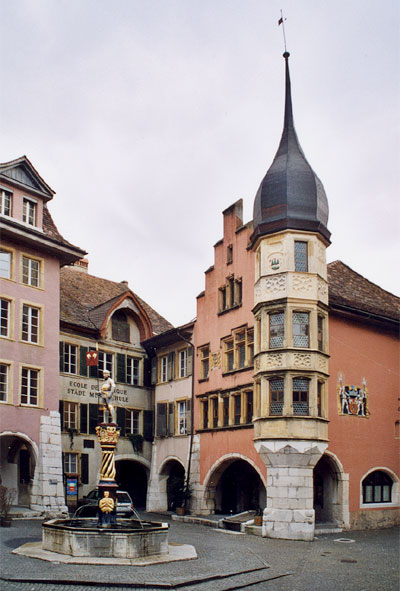
Waldleute Zunft Building

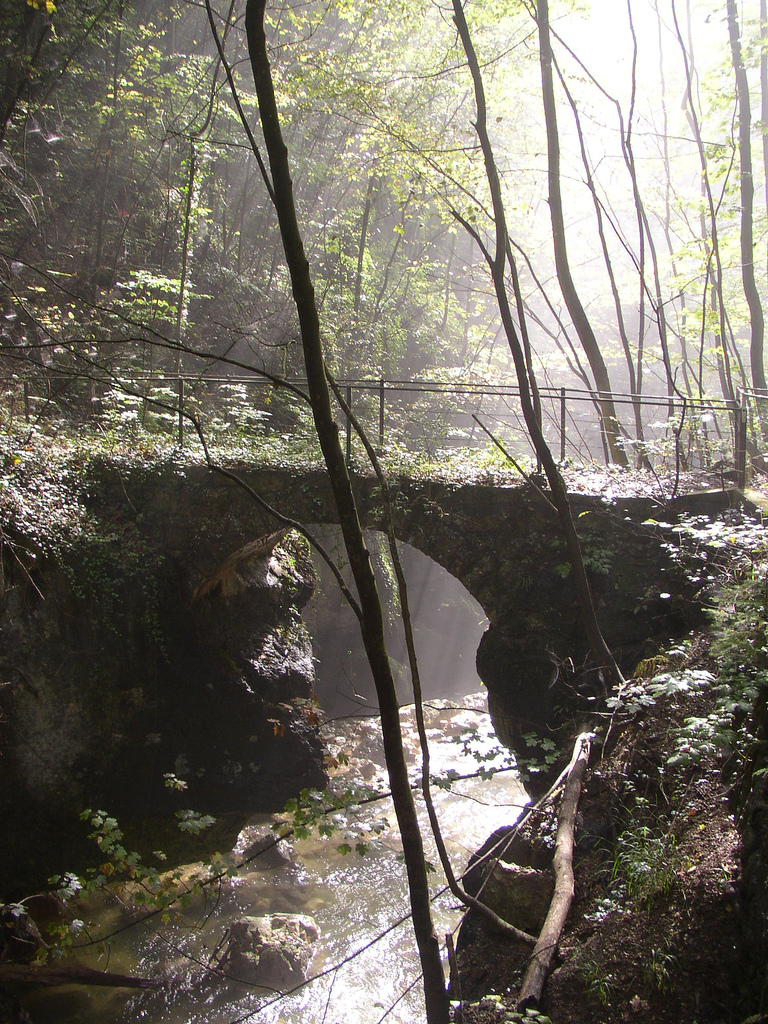
Bridge in Taubenlochschlucht

=== World Heritage Site ===
It is home to the Vingelz / Hafen archaeological site. Vingelz / Hafen is a prehistoric pile-dwelling (or stilt house) settlements that is part of the Prehistoric Pile dwellings around the Alps UNESCO World Heritage Site.

The Vingelz / Hafen site is buried under mud near the shore of Lake Biel. It is one of the best preserved sites on the lake and has had minimal research. Based on the limited studies done on the village, it was occupied around 2970–2820 BC and again in 2780–2695 BC. About 60 wood samples have been dendrochronologically dated. The site was discovered in 1874 by Eduard von Fellenberg while he was excavating a dug-out canoe. In 1985 a series of test borings identified the two archaeological layers with a total thickness of about 90 cm (2 ft 11 in). A text excavation in 1998 found textile remains and a complete axe handle and blade.

== Business ==
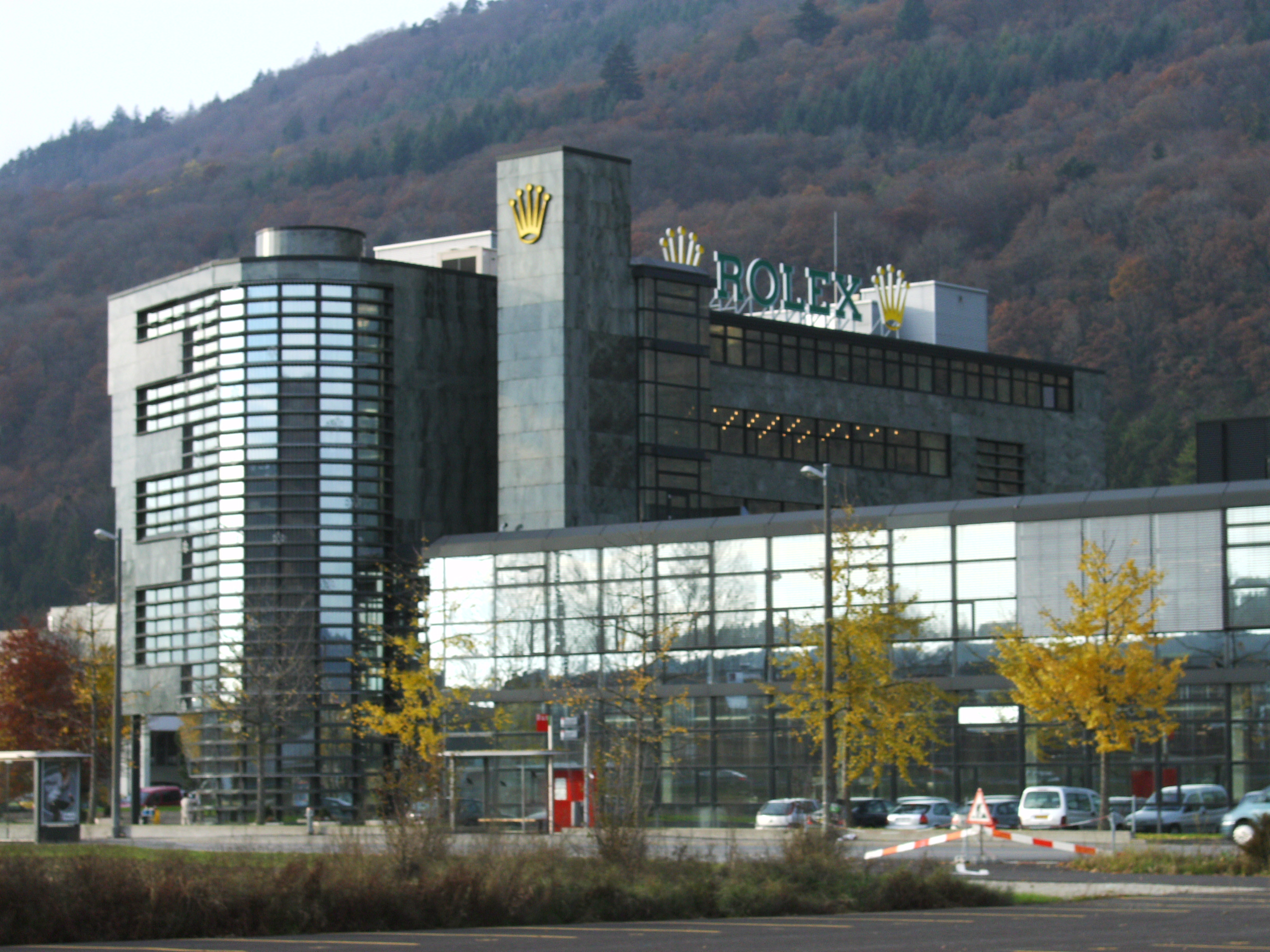
Rolex building in Biel/Bienne

The city and surrounding area are home to companies that design and manufacture specialised machinery and precision tools. Between 1936 and 1975 General Motors Suisse SA assembled over 300,000 General Motors automobiles here, mainly for the Swiss domestic market but also for export to neighboring countries and Yugoslavia. The city is also notable as a center of watchmaking:

- Rolex movement and technical parts production
- Swatch Group has several of its brand headquarters here, especially Omega SA and Swatch.
- The Federation of the Swiss Watch Industry FH
- Glycine Watch SA manufacturing and administration
- Doxa S.A. headquarters

As of 2011, Biel/Bienne had an unemployment rate of 3.95%. As of 2008, there were a total of 33,799 people employed in the municipality. Of these, there were 56 people employed in the primary economic sector and about 10 businesses involved in this sector. 9,421 people were employed in the secondary sector and there were 451 businesses in this sector. 24,322 people were employed in the tertiary sector, with 2,267 businesses in this sector.

In 2008 there were a total of 28,144 full-time equivalent jobs. The number of jobs in the primary sector was 43, of which 21 were in agriculture and 22 were in forestry or lumber production. The number of jobs in the secondary sector was 8,945 of which 7,405 or (82.8%) were in manufacturing and 1,388 (15.5%) were in construction. The number of jobs in the tertiary sector was 19,156. In the tertiary sector; 4,371 or 22.8% were in wholesale or retail sales or the repair of motor vehicles, 1,745 or 9.1% were in the movement and storage of goods, 1,092 or 5.7% were in a hotel or restaurant, 812 or 4.2% were in the information industry, 648 or 3.4% were the insurance or financial industry, 1,708 or 8.9% were technical professionals or scientists, 1,293 or 6.7% were in education and 3,591 or 18.7% were in health care.

In 2000, there were 17,680 workers who commuted into the municipality and 7,990 workers who commuted away. The municipality is a net importer of workers, with about 2.2 workers entering the municipality for every one leaving. Of the working population, 31.2% used public transportation to get to work, and 37.8% used a private car.

== Education ==
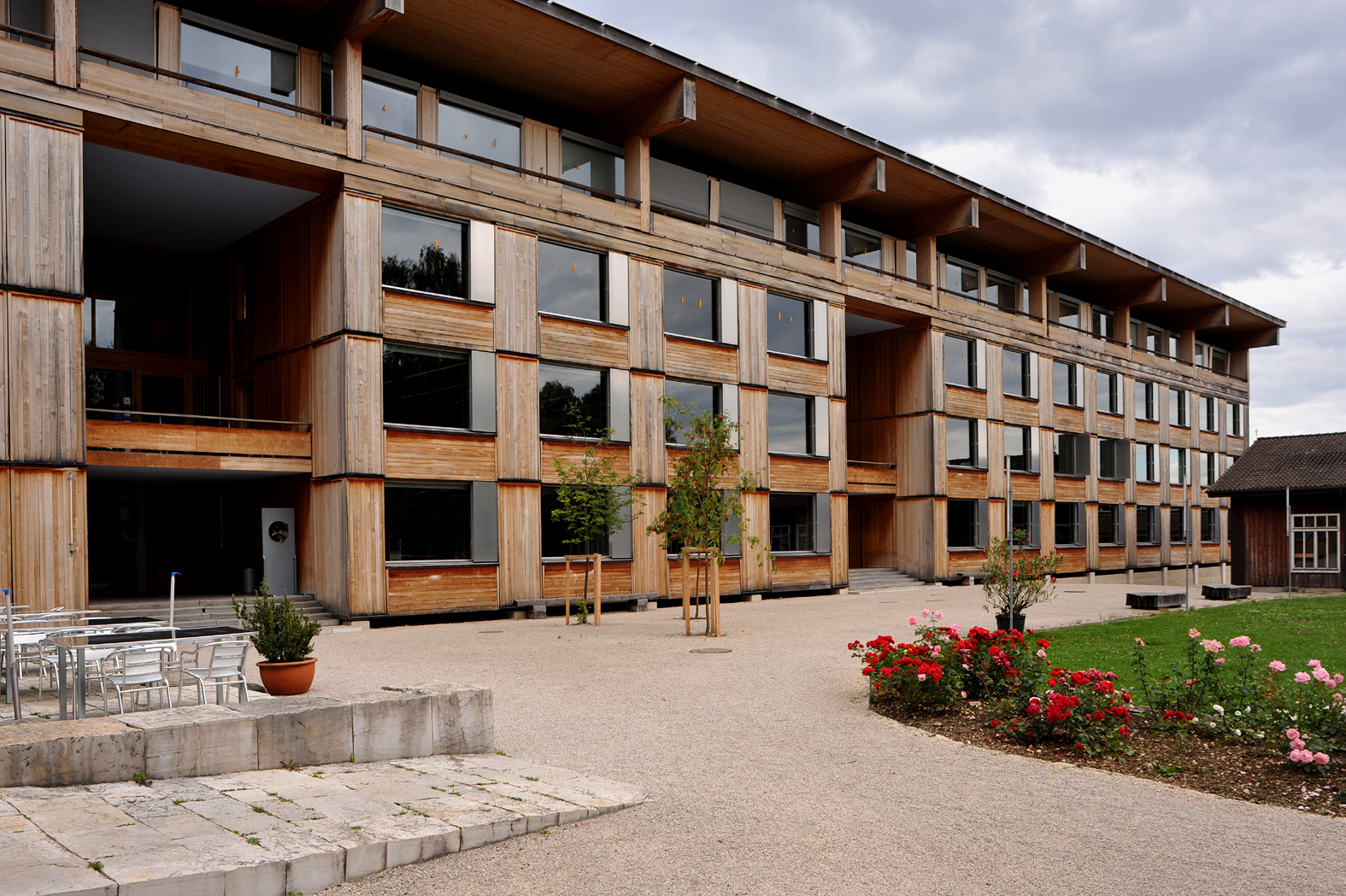
Bern University of Applied Sciences (BFH) Bienne, building of the architecture, wood and civil engineering department, rue de Soleure in Bienne

In Biel/Bienne about 17,768 or (36.5%) of the population have completed non-mandatory upper secondary education, and 5,492 or (11.3%) have completed additional higher education (either university or a Fachhochschule). Of the 5,492 who completed tertiary schooling, 56.6% were Swiss men, 26.4% were Swiss women, 10.5% were non-Swiss men and 6.5% were non-Swiss women.

The Canton of Bern school system provides one year of non-obligatory Kindergarten, followed by six years of Primary school. This is followed by three years of obligatory lower Secondary school where the students are separated according to ability and aptitude. Following the lower Secondary students may attend additional schooling or they may enter an apprenticeship.

During the 2009–10 school year, there were a total of 5,733 students attending classes in Biel/Bienne. There were 27 kindergarten classes with a total of 497 students in the municipality. Of the kindergarten students, 36.2% were permanent or temporary residents of Switzerland (not citizens) and 66.0% have a different mother language than the classroom language. The municipality had 79 primary classes and 1,470 students. Of the primary students, 32.9% were permanent or temporary residents of Switzerland (not citizens) and 53.4% have a different mother language than the classroom language. During the same year, there were 53 lower secondary classes with a total of 981 students. There were 23.6% who were permanent or temporary residents of Switzerland (not citizens) and 29.6% have a different mother language than the classroom language.

As of 2000, there were 3,008 students in Biel/Bienne who came from another municipality, while 517 residents attended schools outside the municipality.

Biel/Bienne is home to 3 libraries. The Stadtbibliothek Biel, the BFH Technik und Informatik TI Biel and the BFH Architektur, Holz und Bau AHB Biel. There was a combined total (as of 2008) of 233,171 books or other media in the libraries, and in the same year a total of 501,646 items were loaned out.

== Culture ==
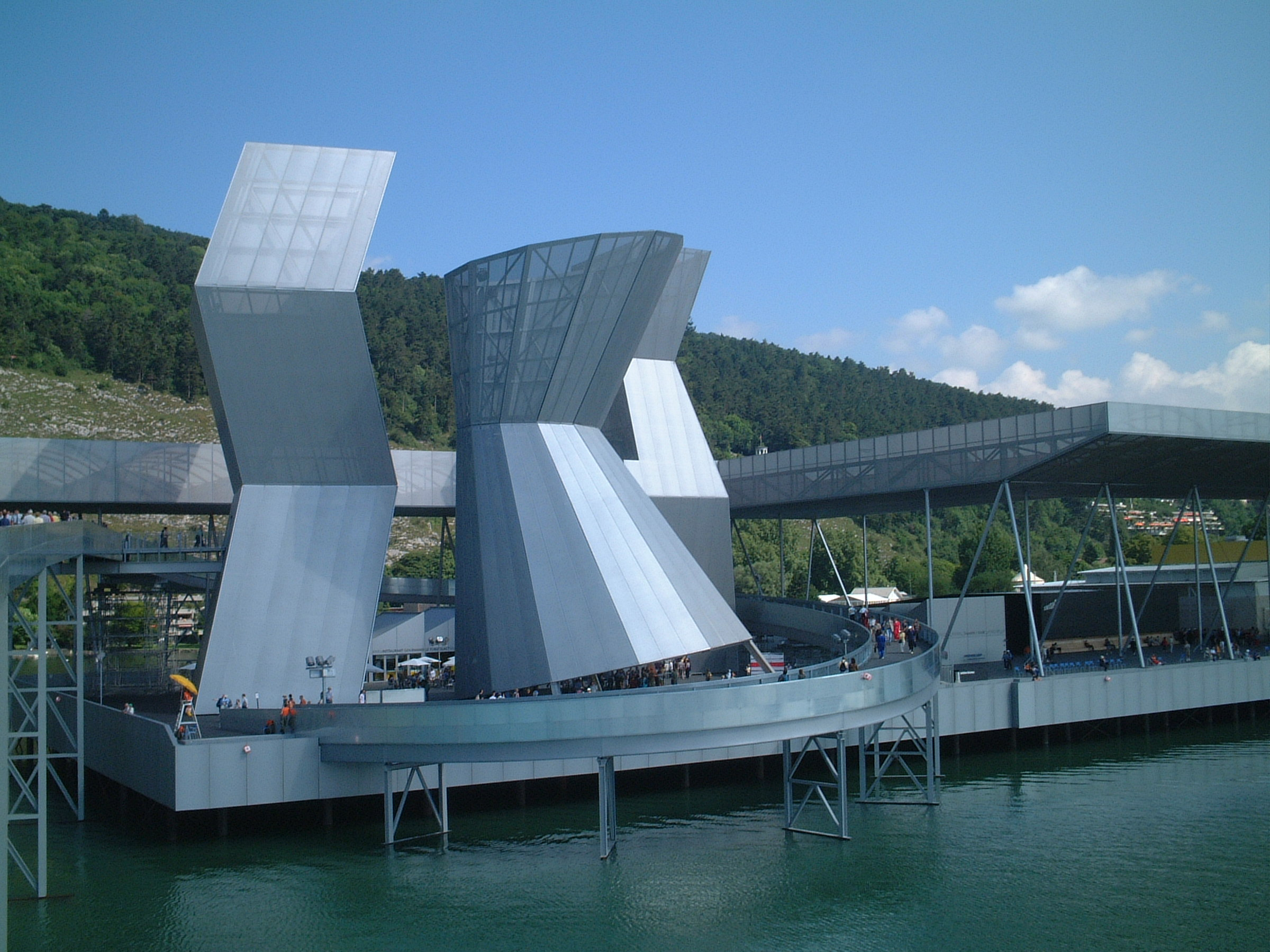
National Exposition in 2002

The newspapers Bieler Tagblatt and Journal du Jura as well as the only totally bilingual German/French newspaper Biel-Bienne with its large free distribution within the greater area, are published in Biel.

The domicile of the Theater Biel Solothurn is situated in the old town.

The town is also known for its annual International Chess Festival.

The town of Biel/Bienne received the Wakker Prize in 2004.

Each June since 1959, Biel has hosted a 100 km Ultramarathon race, which is among the biggest races of its kind worldwide and forms a part of the European Ultramarathon Cup.

== Transport ==
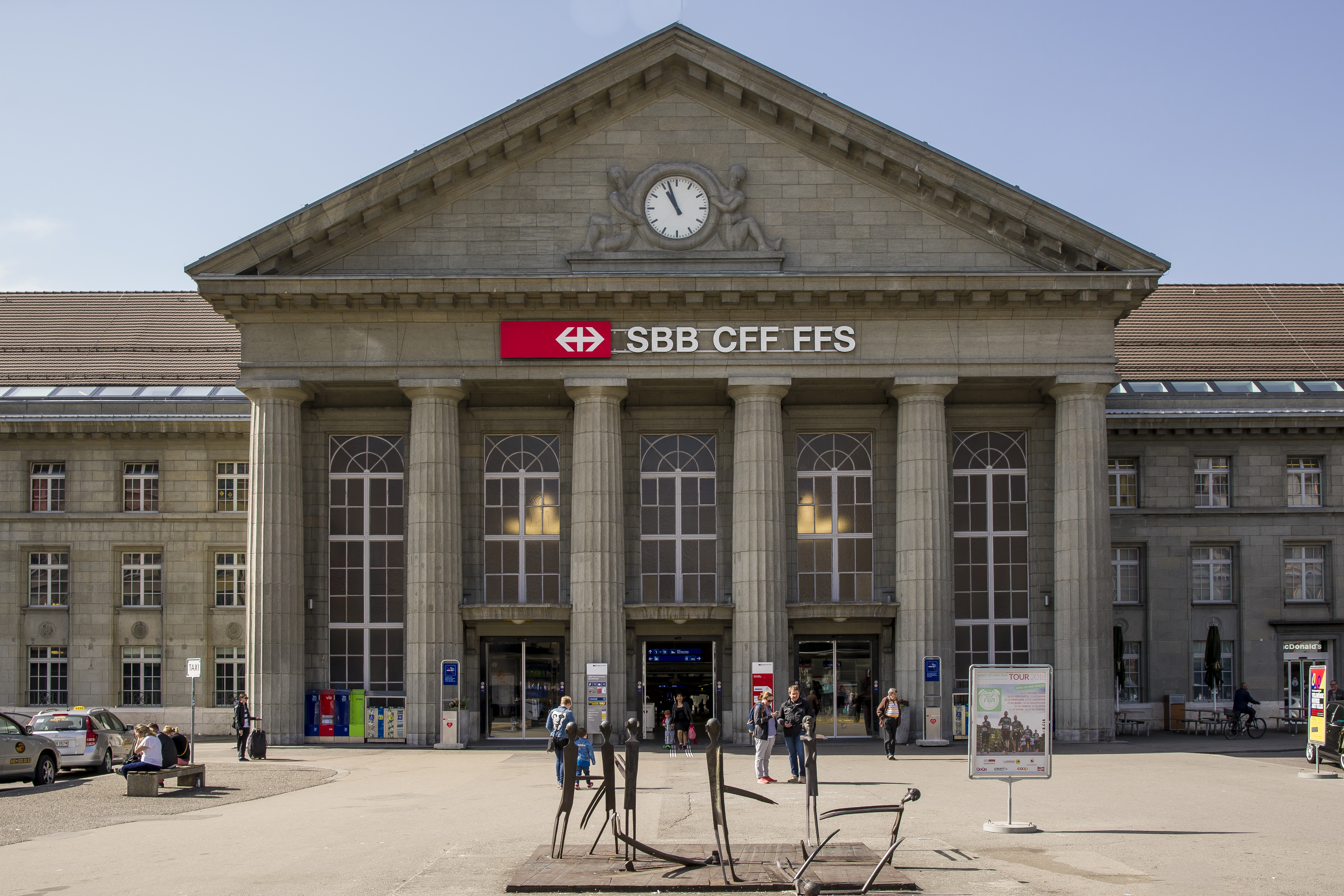
Biel/Bienne's central railway station

Biel/Bienne is very well connected to its region and to Switzerland as well.

The public transport in and around Biel/Bienne is operated by Verkehrsbetriebe Biel/Transports publics biennois, which is integrated into the fare network libero with coordinated timetables, which in itself covers the area of canton of Bern and Solothurn.

The fare network includes any mode of public transport, such as any kind of train (including the urban S-Bahn), PostAuto buses, trams, buses (either trolleybuses or motorized buses) and others. Fares are based on the number of zones crossed during a specified time and are independent of the mode of transport or the number of connections. Most part of Biel/Bienne and including Nidau belong to fare zone 300, including Vingelz/Vigneules in the southwest at the lake, but excluding Hohfluh on the Magglingen funicular and the Bözigerfeld/Champs-de-Boujean in the northeast, which belong to zone 301.

The circle fare zone 301 around Biel/Bienne also includes Tüscherz in the southwest, Hohfluh, Evilard, and Frinvillier (German: Friedliswart, through the Taubenlochschlucht) in the west, and Orpund, Scheuren, Schwadernau, Brügg, Aegerten, and Studen in the east, and Port, Ipsach, Bellmund, Jens, Merzligen, and Hermrigen in the south of the municipality.

Biel/Bienne railway station is not only the central network nucleus of Biel/Bienne, but also of the whole urban and inter-regional region. It connects the town to the regional, national and international railways network (Neuchâtel – Lausanne - Geneva, La Chaux-de-Fonds, Bern, Grenchen – Delémont – Basel, Solothurn – Olten – Luzern/Zurich – St. Gallen, and the canton of Jura). It is a central railway junction on the fast east–(south-)west line and on the Basel–Bern line. The station is Switzerland's thirteenth most busy railway station (about 52,0000 passengers per working day in 2016).

One funicular railways leads to the national sports center of Magglingen/Macolin on the 500 metres (1,600 ft) higher Jura mountain in the west, and the other, the Bienne-Evilard Funicular, to the city hospital and to neighbouring municipality Evilard to northwest, both above the town on the eastern range of the Jura Mountains. The high, flat pastures and wood of Magglingen/Macolin span about 7 kilometres (4.3 mi) from northeast to southwest at an altitude between 800 and 1,031 metres (2,625 and 3,383 ft). The Magglingen/Macolin Funicular often leads to sunshine while Biel/Bienne is covered by low hanging clouds.

The port at the north-eastern end of Lake Biel is a starting point for leisurely journeys to the three lakes of Biel, Neuchâtel, and Murten/Morat through the Three-Lakes Landscape, which are all connected by navigable channels and rivers. The port is situated on the west side of the main railway station between the exit of the river Schüss/La Suze arriving from the Jura in the west through the Taubenlochschlucht (Swiss German for pigeon hole gorge) and the navigable Nidau-Büren Canal with connections as far as Solothurn.

Several bridges over the Nidau-Büren Canal connect the town to its south/eastern suburbs.

Biel/Bienne is well connected to other Swiss cities by several motorways (A6 to Bern, and via A5 to both, the Jura and Basel, Luzern, Zurich, St. Gallen).

The town is very well connected to all Swiss international airports: Geneva Airport (1:40h), EuroAirport Basel Mulhouse Freiburg (1:30h), and Zurich Airport (1:30h), also serve as international gateways, all reachable within about the same time by direct train from Biel/Bienne.

== Sport ==
- EHC Biel, the professional ice hockey team
- FC Biel-Bienne, the football club.

== Notable people ==
=== Honoured citizen ===
- Nicolas Hayek (1928–2010), Lebanese-American Swiss businessman, co-founder, CEO and chairman of the board of The Swatch Group. Promoted to honourable citizenship in 2004, official ceremony held on 19 February 2005

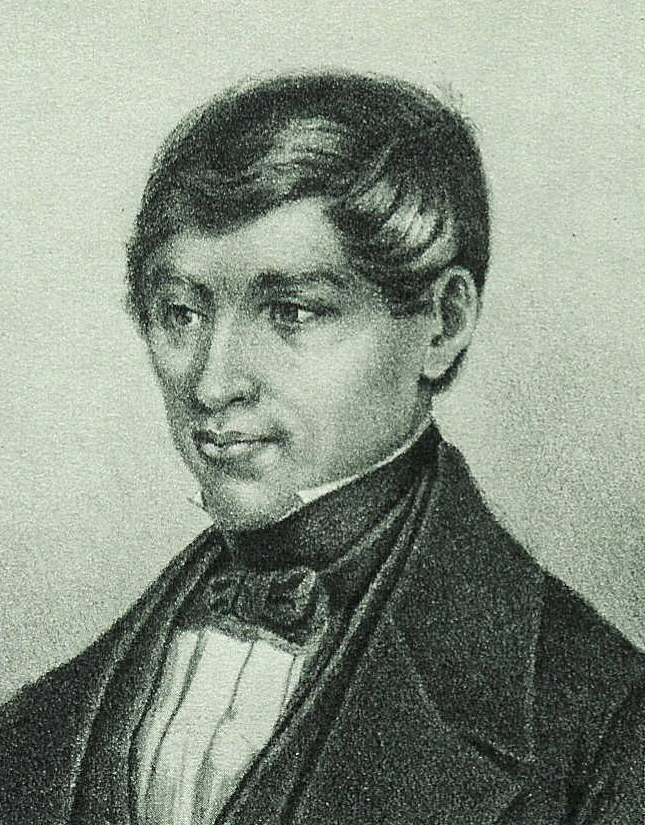
Eduard Bloesch

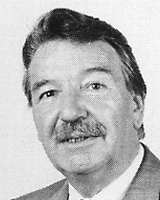
René Felber

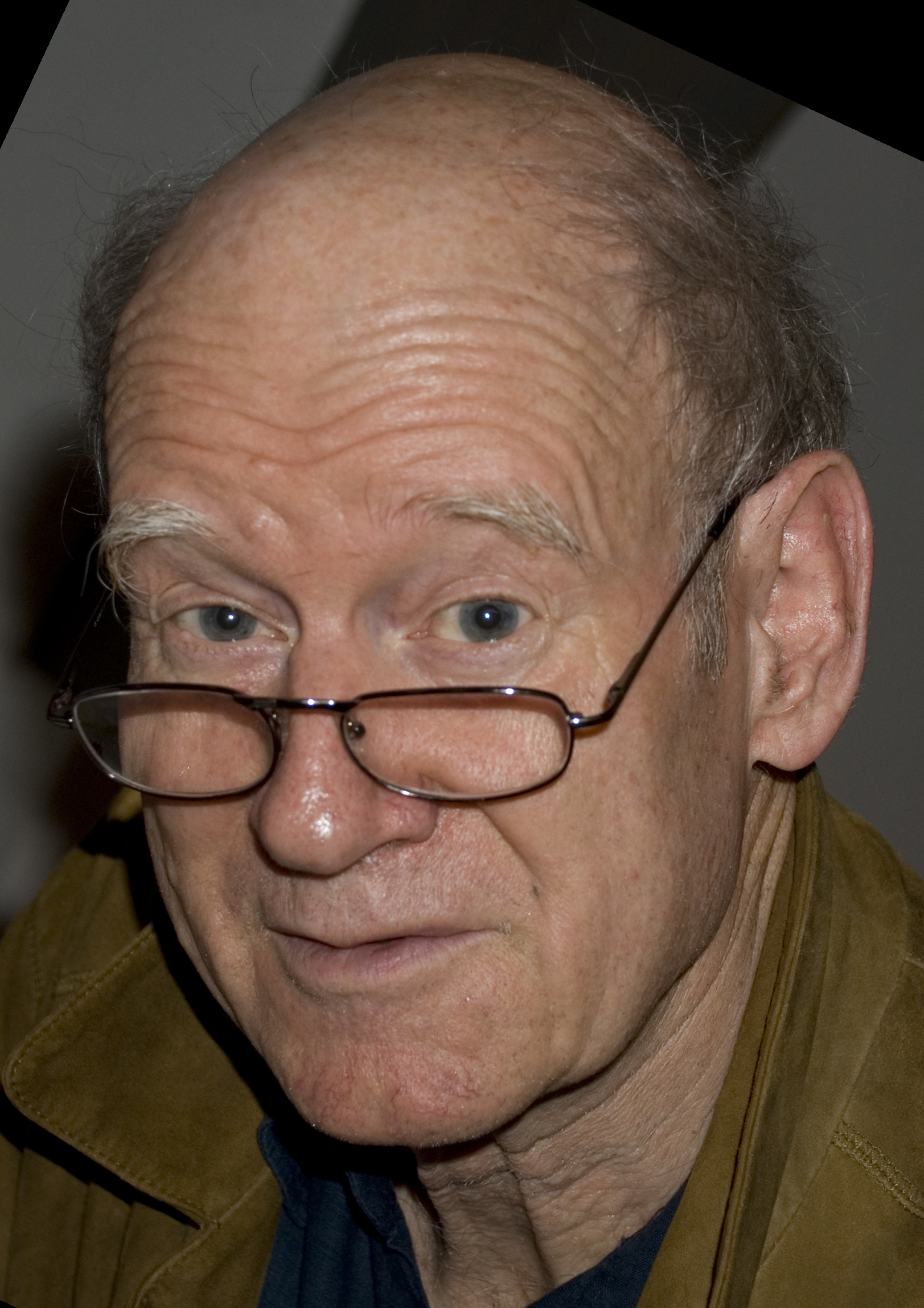
Franz Hohler, 2008

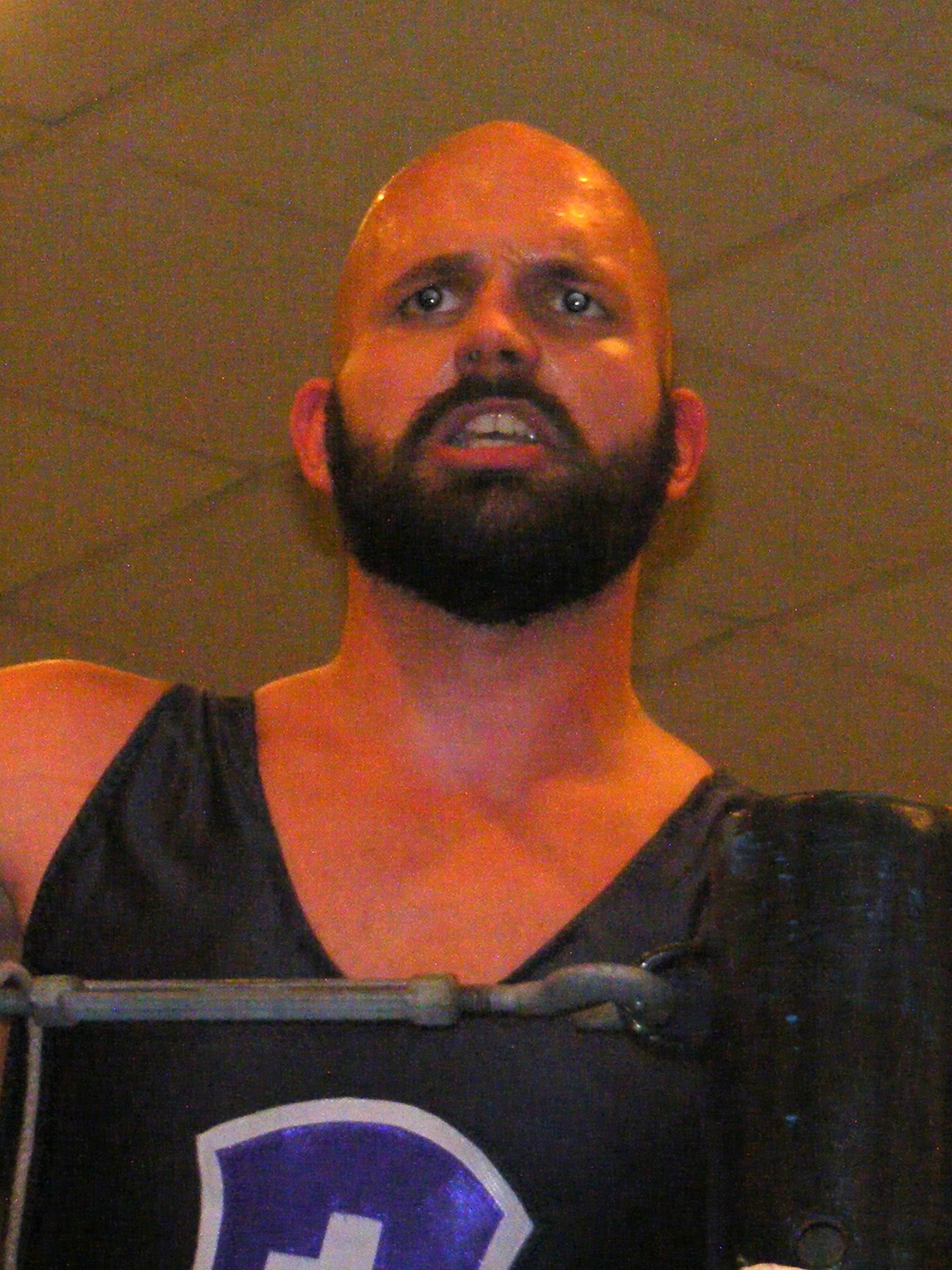
Ares, 2010

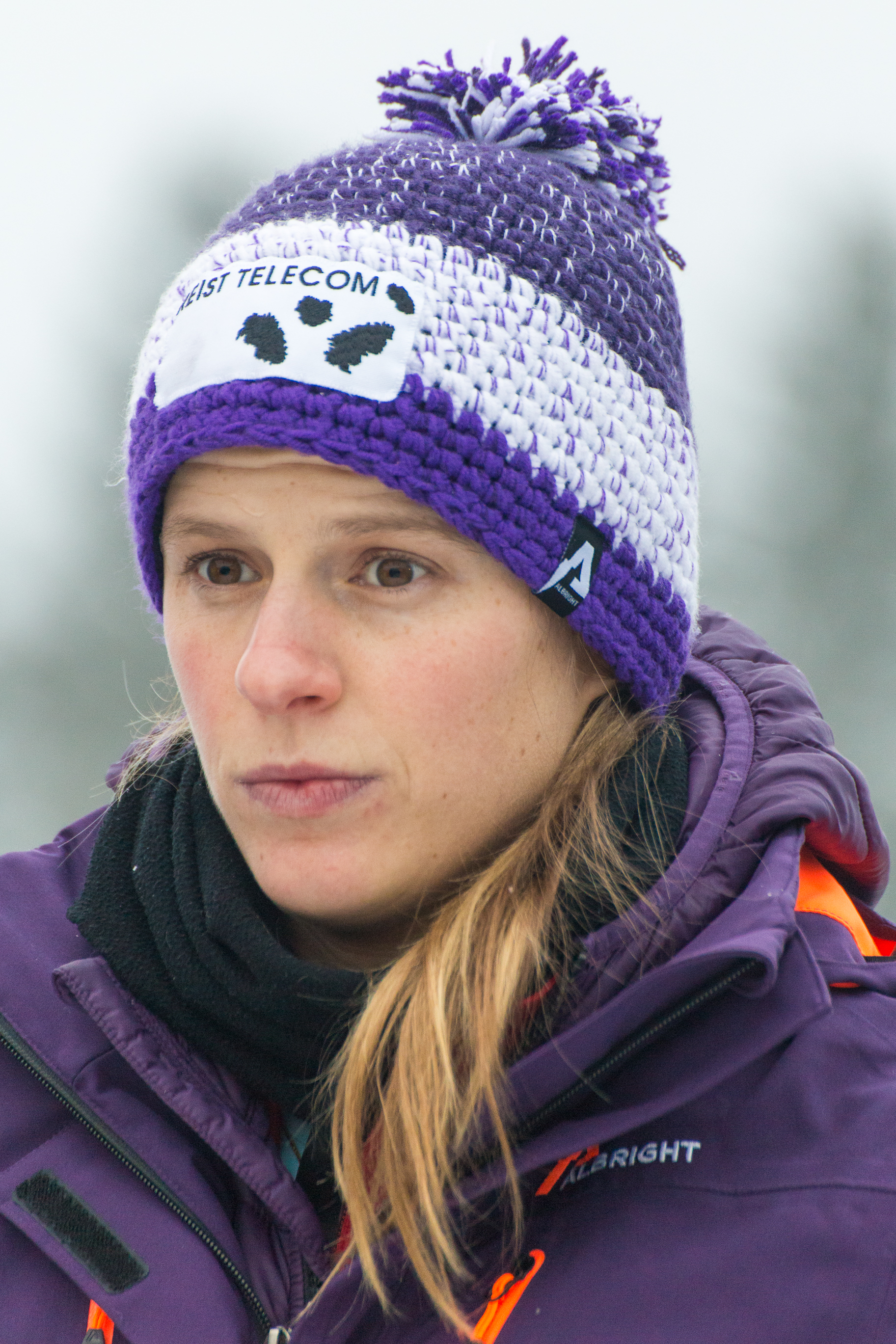
Martina Kocher, 2016

=== Born in Biel/Bienne ===
Middle Ages

- Thomas Wyttenbach (c. 1472–1526), one of the reformers of the city of Biel during the Protestant Reformation.
- Emanuel Witz (1717–1797), Swiss painter
- Eduard Blösch (1807–1866), Swiss politician, President of the Swiss National Council 1855–1856
- Léo-Paul Robert (1851–1923), Swiss painter

19th century

- Karl Walser (1877–1943), Swiss painter, stage designer, illustrator, muralist and artist
- Robert Walser (1878–1956), German-speaking Swiss writer
- Ernst Dubach (1881–1982), Swiss racing cyclist, the Swiss National Road Race champion in 1902
- Louis Rivier (1885–1963), Swiss painter, writer, and stained glass artist
- Hans Zulliger (1893–1965), Swiss teacher, child psychoanalyst and author
- Anna Renfer (1896–1984), Swiss composer

20th century

- Jean-Louis Jeanmaire (1910–1992), brigadier in the Swiss army who passed highly classified Swiss military secrets to the Soviet Union from 1962 until he retired in 1975
- Roland Kuhn (1912–2005), Swiss psychiatrist who discovered that the drug imipramine had antidepressant properties
- Walter Kistler (1918–2015), physicist, inventor and philanthropist
- Maurice Edmond Müller (1918–2009), orthopedic surgeon, developed internal fixation techniques to fix bone fractures
- Géo Voumard (1920–2008), Swiss jazz pianist and composer, co-founded the Montreux Jazz Festival
- Felix Villars (1921–2002), American professor of physics at MIT, worked in quantum field theory, emigrated in 1949
- Henriette Grindat (1923–1986), Swiss photographer, contributed to artistic photography, taking a Surrealist approach
- René Felber (1933–2020), Swiss politician, member of the Swiss Federal Council 1987–1993
- Raymond Bruckert (1935–2017), writer of novels and educational books
- Ernst Thomke (born 1939), businessman, corporate saviour by interventions
- Franz Hohler (born 1943), author of one-man and satirical programs for TV and radio, and cabaret artist.
- Christian Philipp Müller (born 1957), Swiss artist
- Thomas Jordan (born 1963), chairman of the Swiss National Bank
- Ian Christe (born 1970), author, disc jockey and the publisher of Bazillion Points Books
- Denis Simonet (born 1985), Swiss Pirate Party politician
- Nemo Mettler (born 1999), singer and rapper; Swiss representative and winner of the Eurovision Song Contest 2024

Sport

- Nicolas Bührer (born 1944), Swiss entrepreneur and former racing driver
- Enzo Calderari (born 1952), Swiss entrepreneur and former racing driver
- Robert Lüthi (born 1958), retired Swiss footballer, played 291 games for Neuchâtel Xamax
- Markus Graf (born 1959), Swiss former ice hockey player, coach, and executive
- Étienne Dagon (born 1960), former breaststroke swimmer, bronze medallist at the 1984 Summer Olympics
- Sven Christ (born 1973), Swiss football manager and former football player with 427 games
- Andréa Zimmermann (born 1976), Swiss ski mountaineer and mountain runner
- Yannick Pelletier (born 1976), Swiss chess player who lives in Paris
- Marcel Fischer (born 1978), Swiss fencer, gold medallist in the Men's Épée Individual at the 2004 Summer Olympics
- Ares (Marco Jaggi) (born 1980), Swiss professional wrestler and wrestling trainer
- Raphael Nuzzolo (born 1983), Swiss professional footballer, played over 475 games
- Martina Kocher (born 1985), Swiss luger, competed in the 2006 and 2010 Winter Olympics
- Pietro Di Nardo (born 1990), Swiss professional footballer, played over 250 games
- Gregory Hofmann (born 1992), professional ice hockey player
- Nicola Todeschini (born 1997), Swiss figure skater
- Aurèle Amenda (born 2003), Swiss professional footballer

Music

- Nemo Mettler (born 1999), Swiss rapper and winner of the 2024 Eurovision Song Contest

=== Lived in Biel/Bienne ===
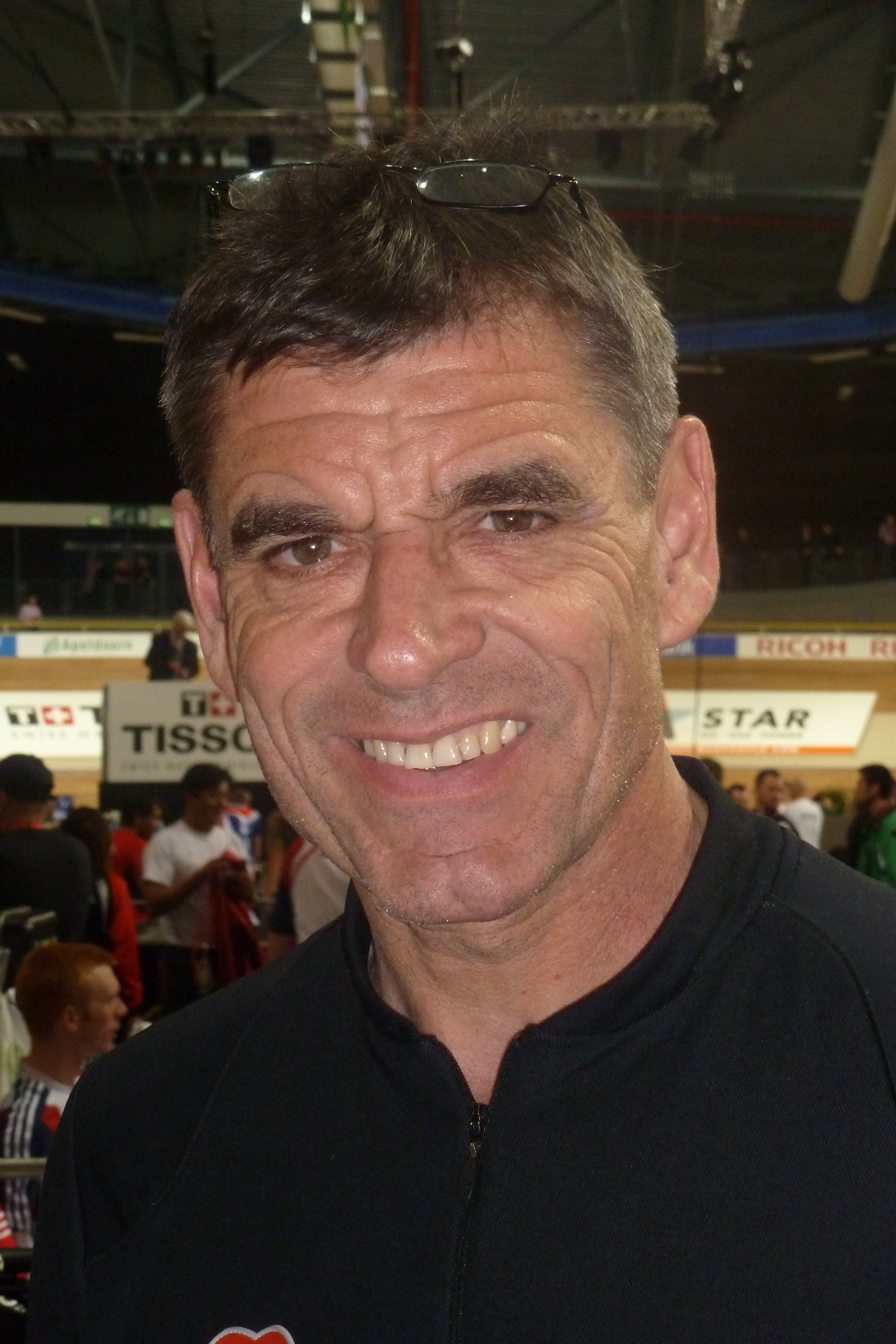
Daniel Gisiger, 2011

- Paul Käser (1904–??), Swiss rower active in the 1920s and 1930s
- Henri Dubuis (1906–2003), Swiss architect, designed and built the Volkshaus in Biel/Bienne in 1932
- Daniel Gisiger (born 1954), retired Swiss road and track cyclist
- Jonas Kocher (born 1977), musician, accordionist and composer
- Arno Camenisch (born 1978), Swiss writer in German and Romansh
- Henri Laaksonen (born 1992), Swiss-Finnish tennis player
- Oliver Hegi (born 1993), Swiss male artistic gymnast and member of the national team
- Jil Teichmann (born 1997), Spanish-born Swiss tennis player
- Félicienne Lusamba Villoz-Muamba (1956–2019), Congolese-Swiss politician and activist

== Gallery ==
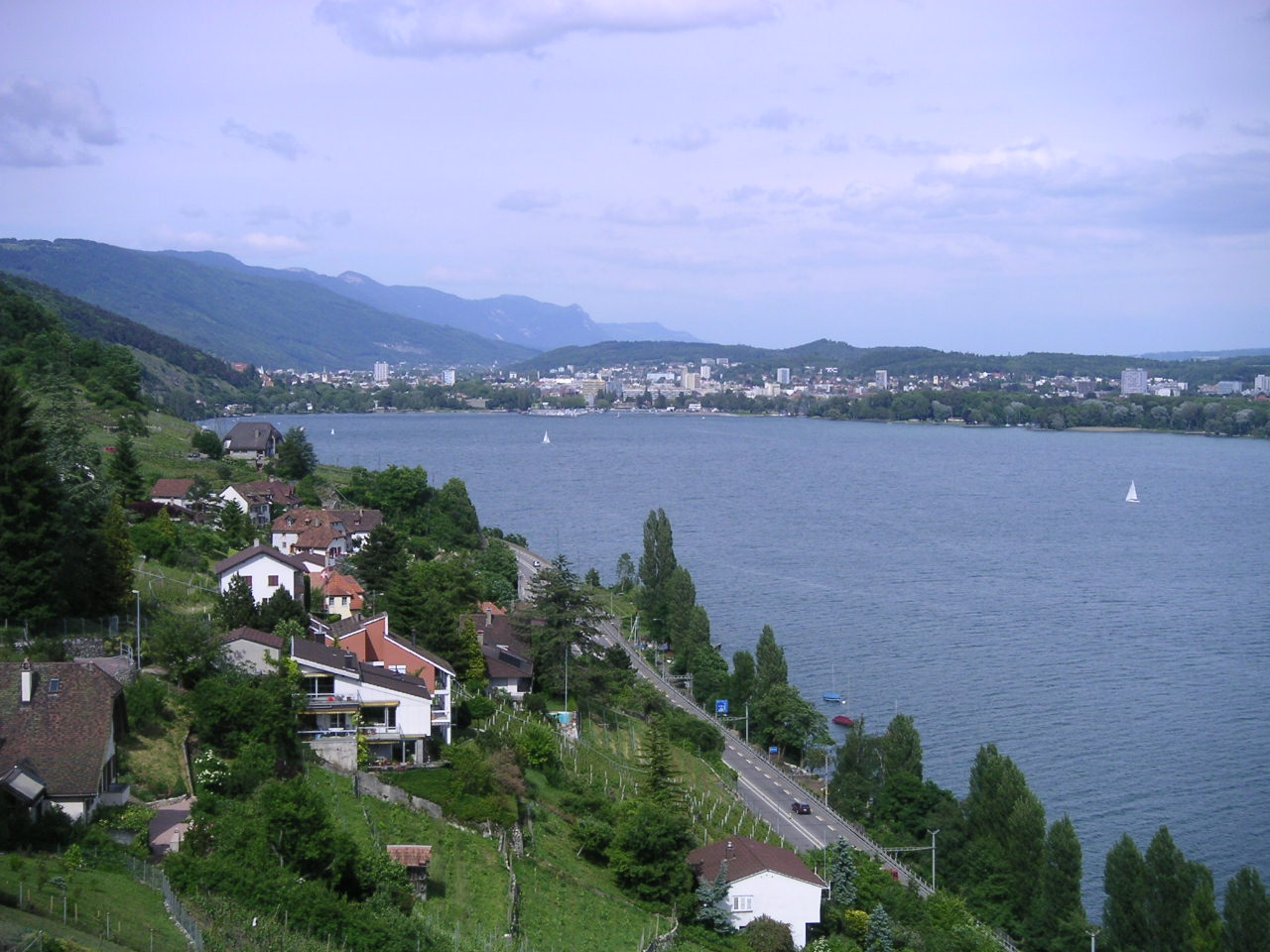
Lake Bienne

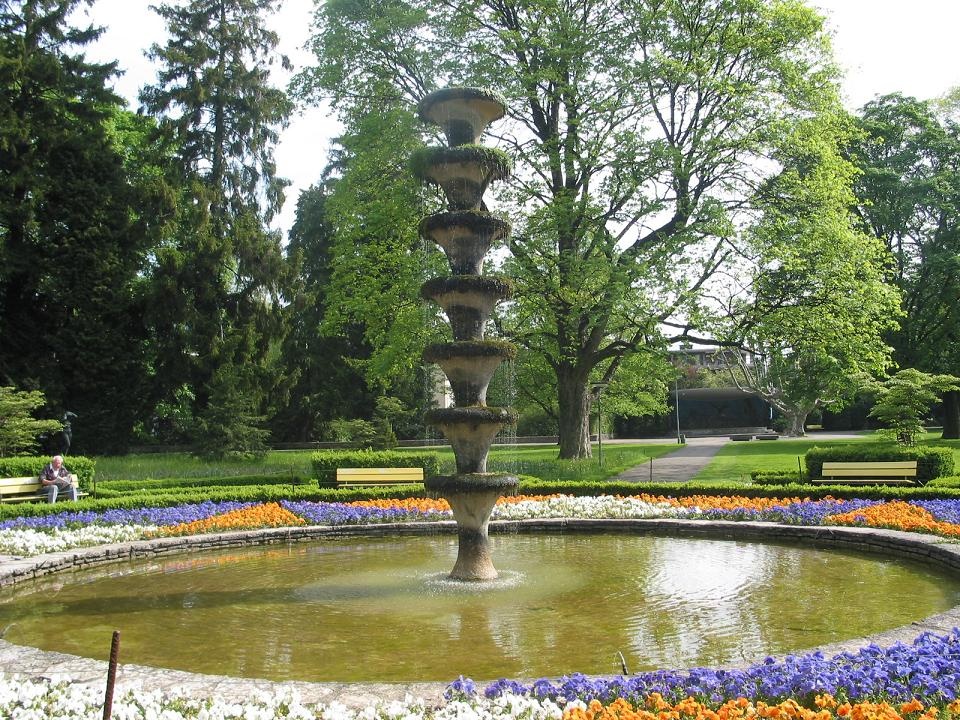
town's park

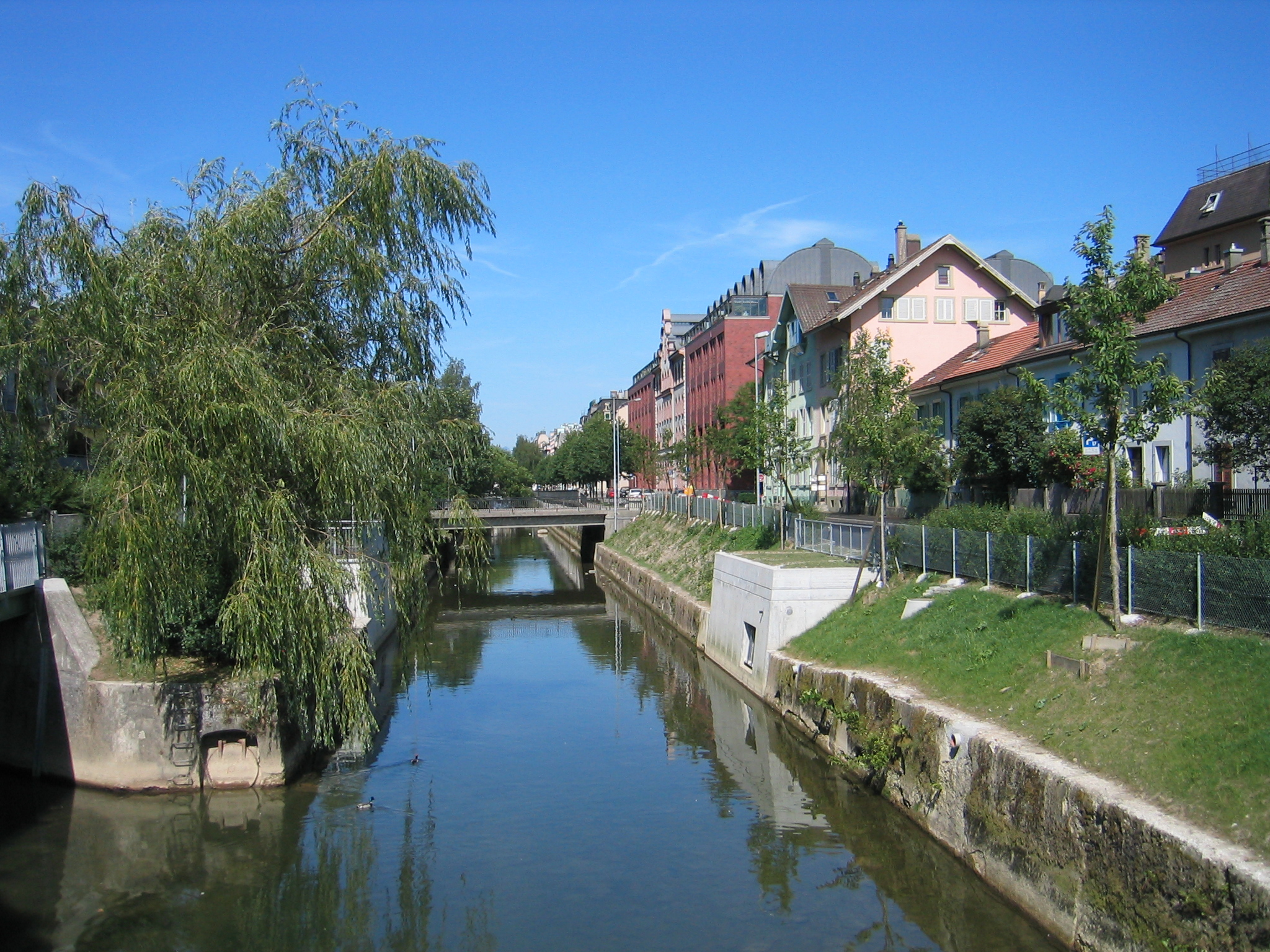
the river Suze

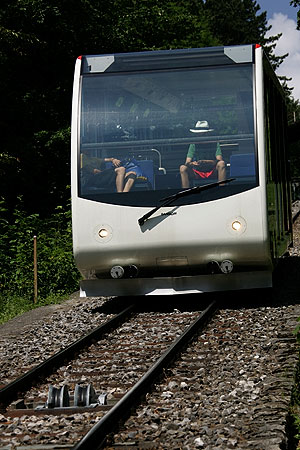
Funiculaire Bienne–Macolin

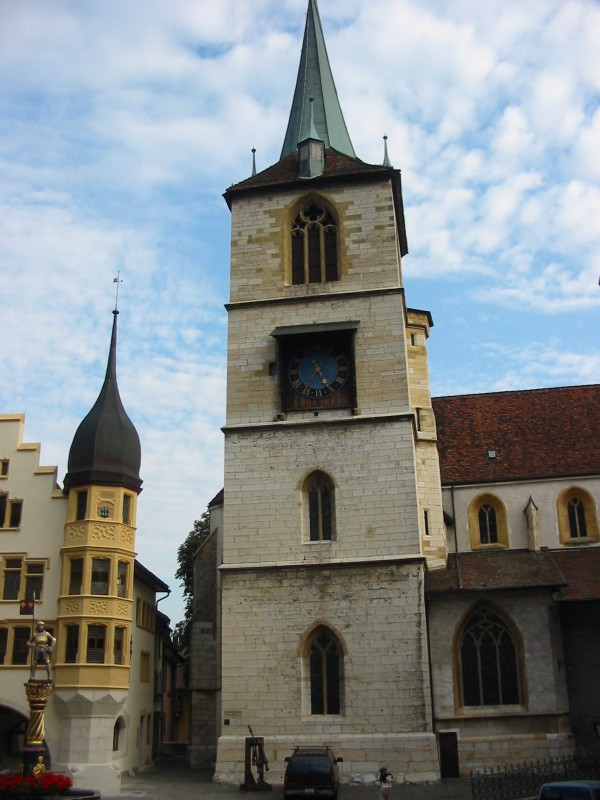
Place du Ring

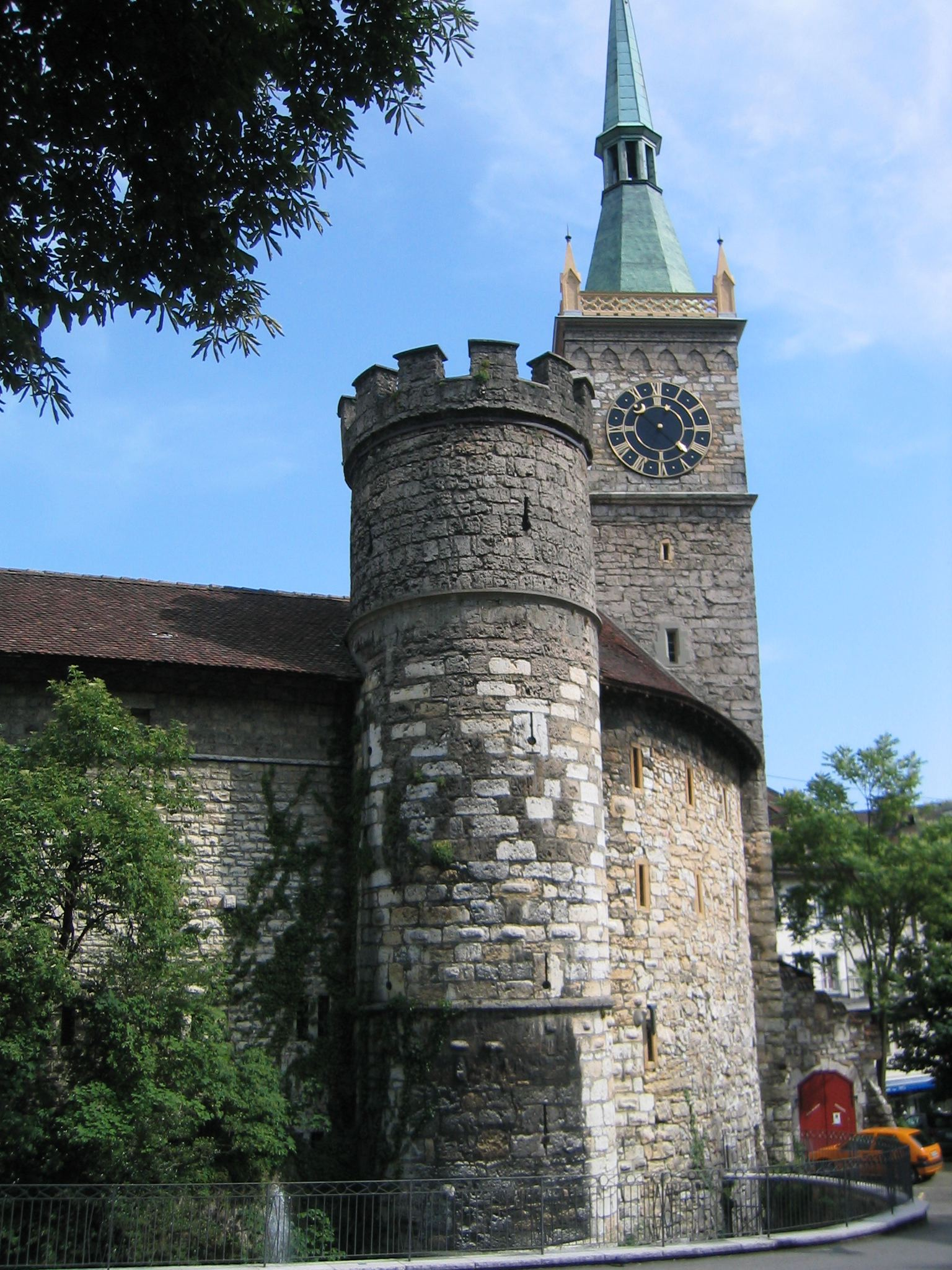
old town

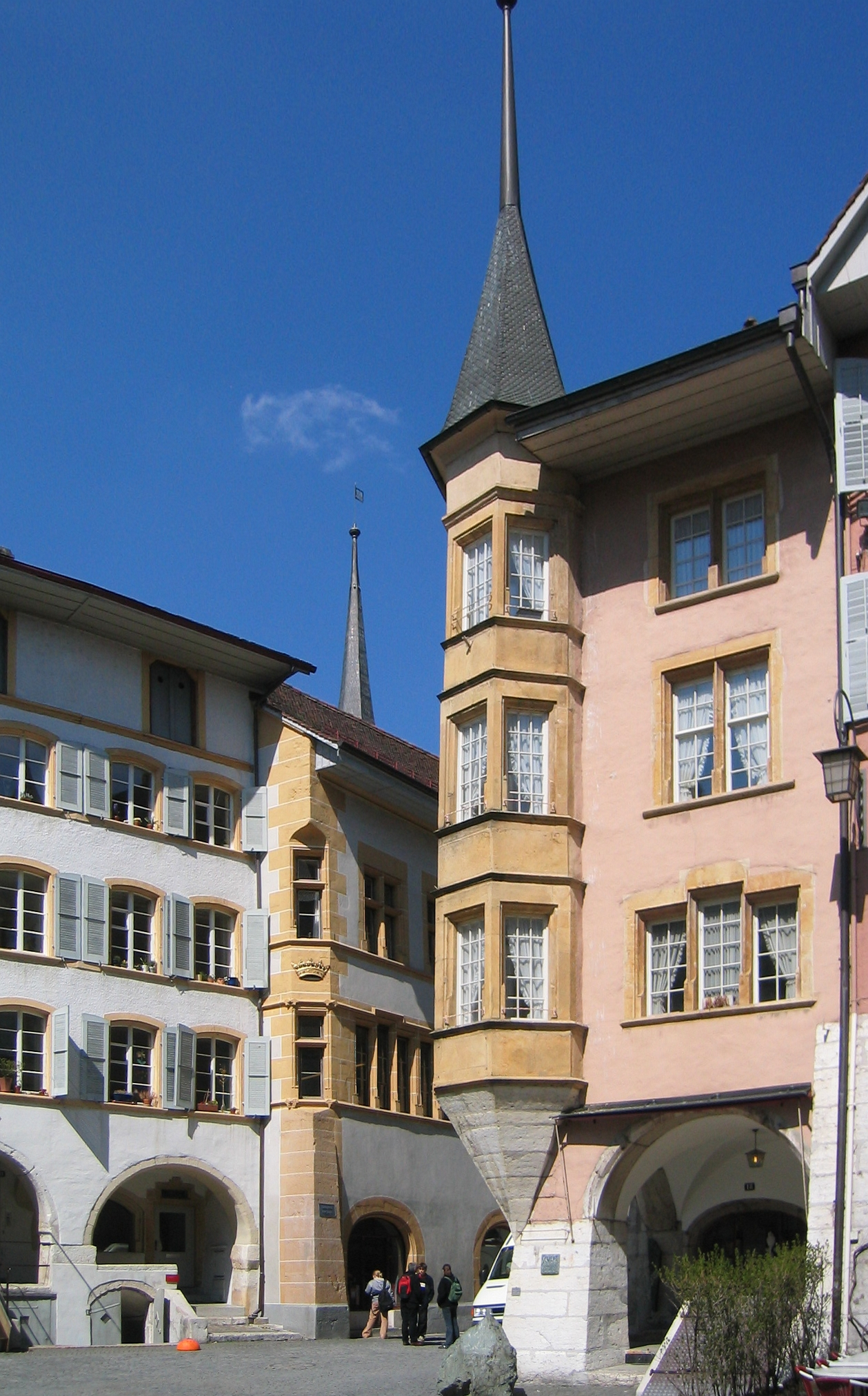
old town

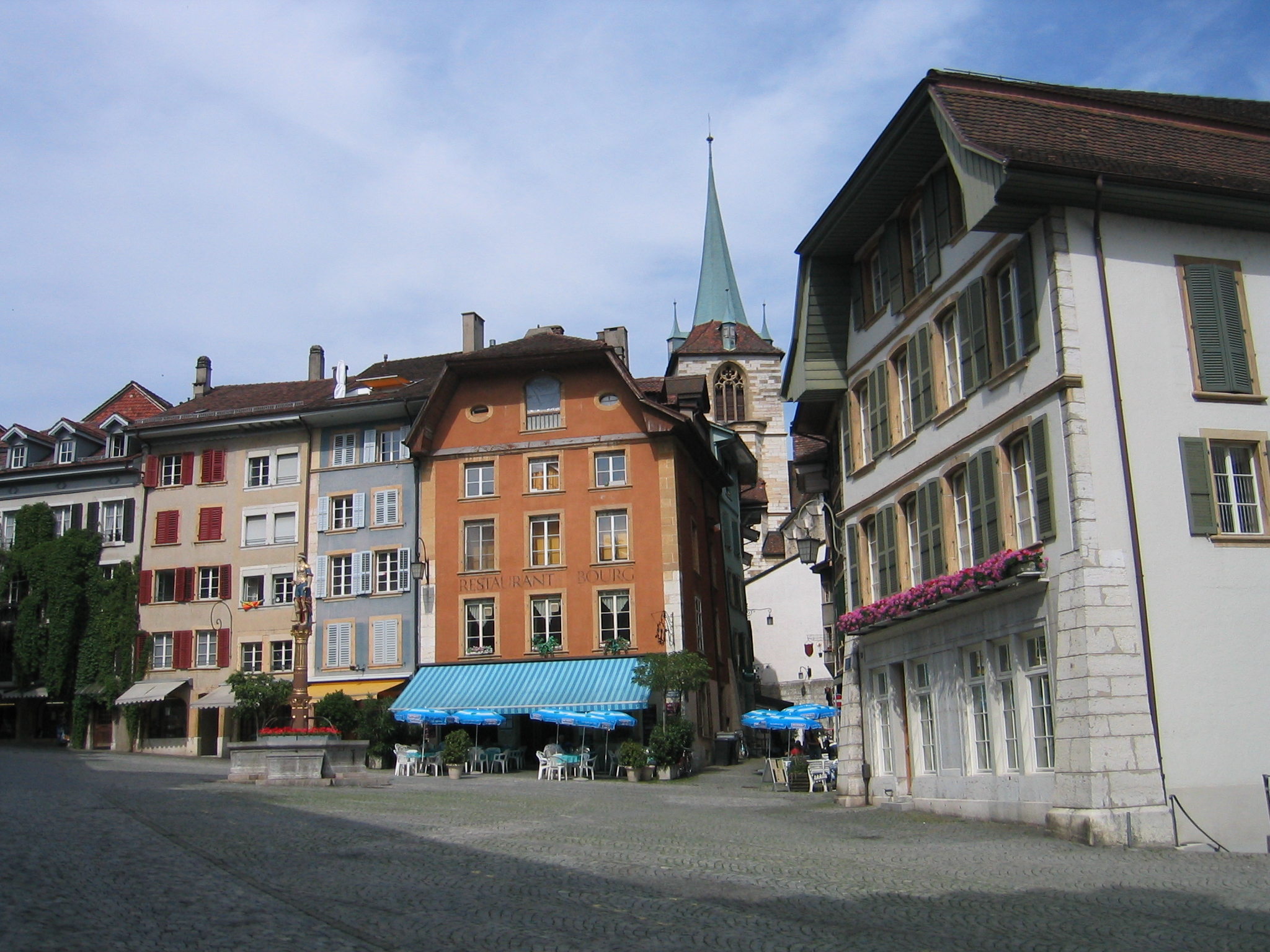
old town

== See also ==
- Cimier
