= Safnern =

- Municipality
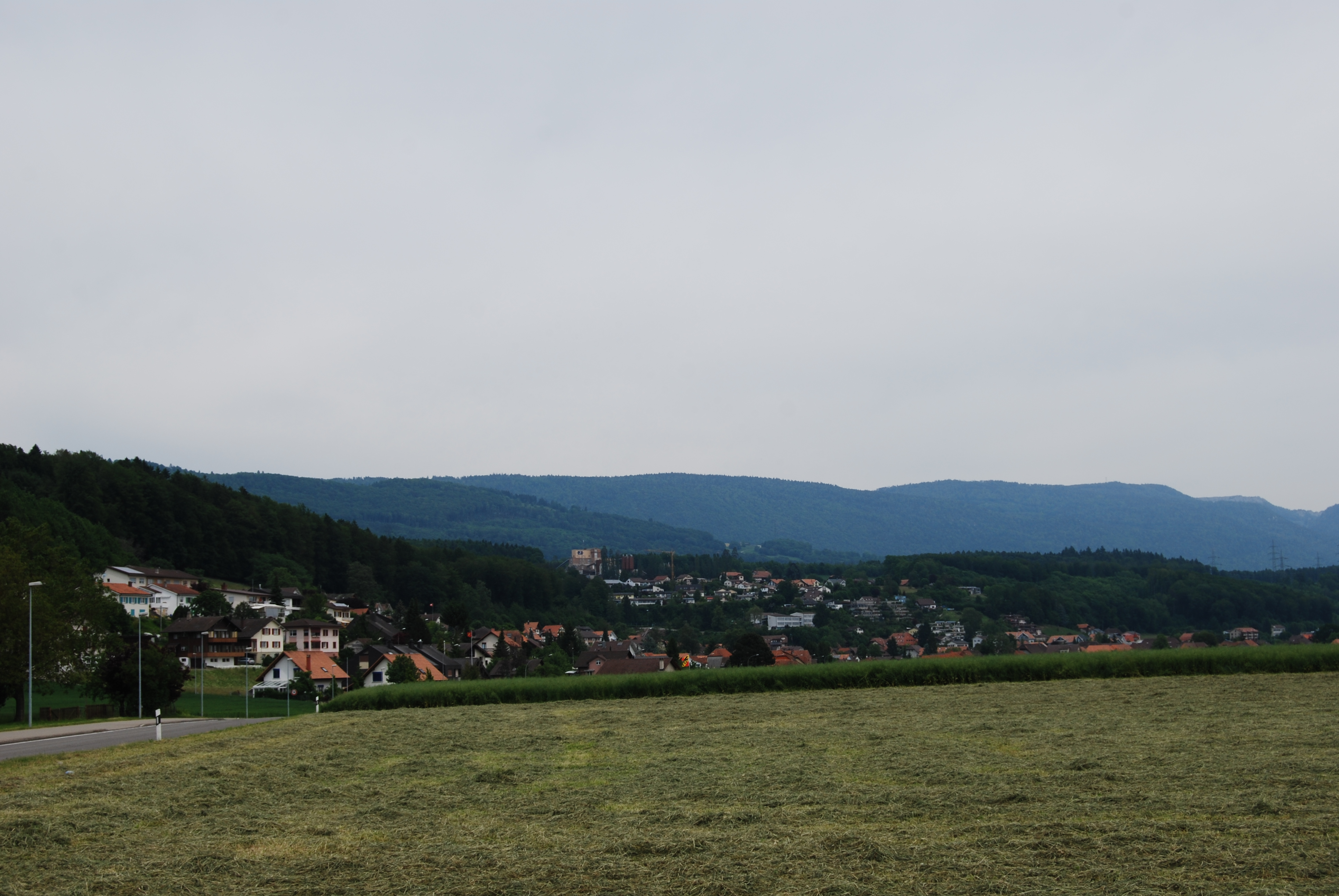

- Flag Coat of arms
- Location of Safnern
- Location within Switzerland Location within Canton of Bern
- Coordinates: 47°9′N 7°19′E
- Country: Switzerland
- Canton: Bern
- District: Biel/Bienne

Government
  - Executive: Gemeinderat with 5 members
  - Mayor: Gemeindepräsident; Thomas Winterhalder (as of 2026)

Area
  - Total: 5.6 km^{2} (2.2 sq mi)
- Elevation: 436 m (1,430 ft)

Population (December 2020)
  - Total: 1,951
  - Density: 350/km^{2} (900/sq mi)
- Time zone: UTC+01:00 (CET)
  - Summer (DST): UTC+02:00 (CEST)
- Postal code: 2553
- SFOS number: 746
- ISO 3166 code: CH-BE
- Surrounded by: Pieterlen, Meinisberg, Büren an der Aare, Meienried, Scheuren BE, Orpund, Biel/Bienne
- Website: www.safnern.ch

Safnern is a municipality in the Biel/Bienne administrative district in the canton of Bern in Switzerland.

== History ==
Safnern is first mentioned in 1251 as Savenieres.

The oldest trace of a settlement in the area is the ruins of a Roman settlement in the Moosmühle section. During the Middle Ages there were several scattered villages and settlements within the modern municipal borders. The villages of Büttenberg and Stadholz (also known as Stadowe) and the castle on the Schlösslihubel hill all flourished and then were abandoned. The major landholders in Safnern were the Counts of Neuchâtel-Nidau and Gottstatt Abbey. With the extinction of the Neuchâtel-Nidau line in 1375, Safnern came under Bernese control. It formed the Safnern Court within the bailiwick of Nidau until the 1798 French invasion. After which Safnern became part of the Büren district under the Helvetic Republic. With the Act of Mediation in 1803, it became part of the Nidau district.

By 1783 the large village had 50 houses. Located along the Zihl/Thielle and Aare rivers the residents grew crops in the rich farmland and fished the rivers. The Jura water correction project of 1847-48 changed the course of the Aare river but helped protect the village from flooding. The Nidau-Büren Canal of 1868-75 further reshaped the landscape around Safnern. Today the municipal boundary still follows the old Zihl/Thielle and Aare riverbeds. As Biel grew into an industrial city in the 1950s, Safnern became a suburb. Despite having several industrial factories in the municipality, about three-quarters of the working population commute to jobs in Biel or other towns. In 2005 about 60% of the jobs in Safnern were in industry, while 28% were in the services sector. However, Safnern is also surrounded with green spaces, it shares the Häftli nature reserve with the neighboring municipalities of Büren an der Aare and Meinisberg.

== Geography ==
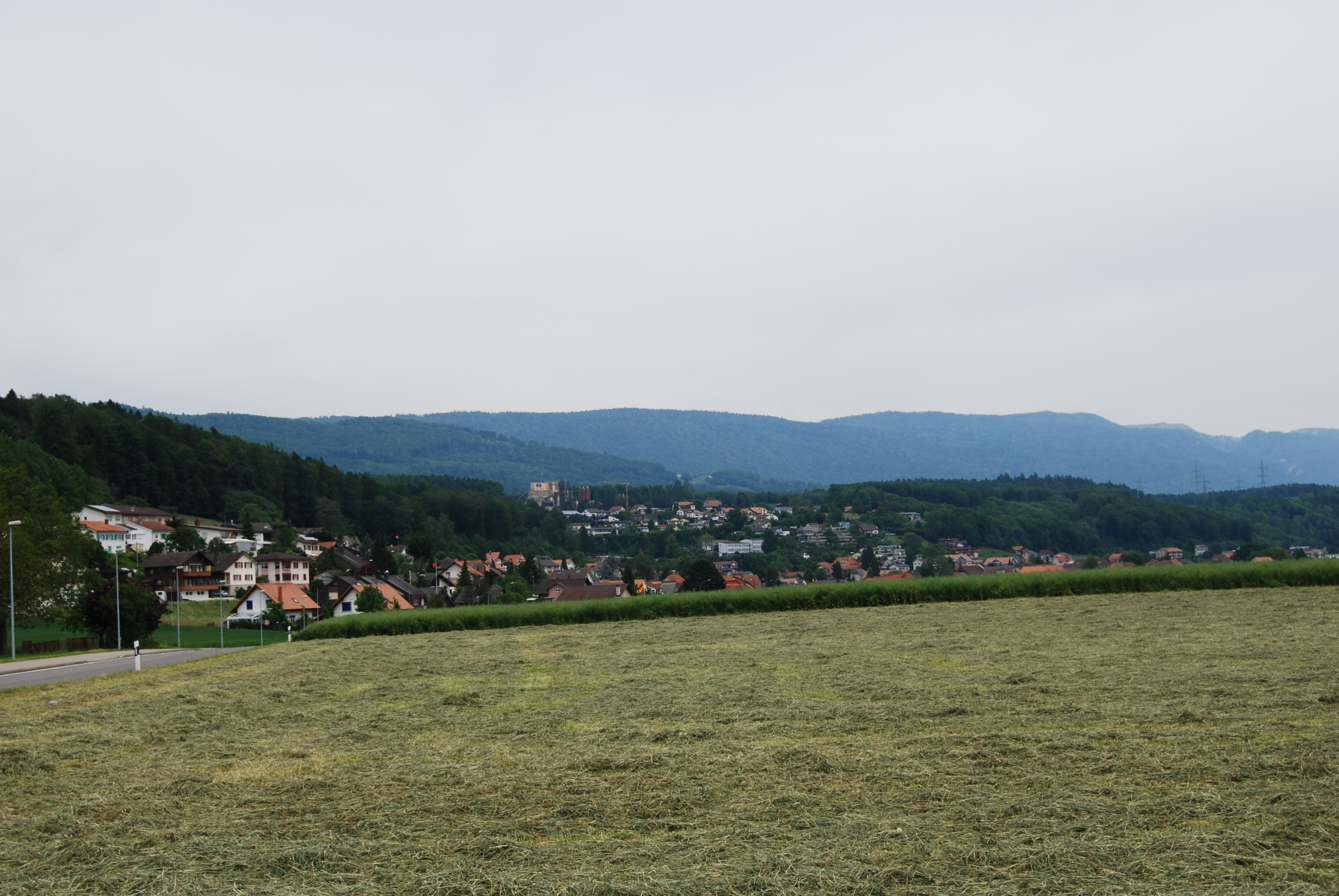
Safnern and its surroundings

Safnern has an area of 5.62 km^{2} (2.17 sq mi). As of 2012, a total of 2.45 km^{2} (0.95 mi^{2}) or 43.6% is used for agricultural purposes, while 1.9 km^{2} (0.73 mi^{2}) or 33.8% is forested. Of the rest of the land, 1 km^{2} (0.39 mi^{2}) or 17.8% is settled (buildings or roads), 0.17 km^{2} (0.066 mi^{2}) or 3.0% is either rivers or lakes and 0.11 km^{2} (27 acres) or 2.0% is unproductive land.

During the same year, industrial buildings made up 2.0% of the total area while housing and buildings made up 8.4% and transportation infrastructure made up 3.4%. Power and water infrastructure as well as other special developed areas made up 3.4% of the area Out of the forested land, all of the forested land area is covered with heavy forests. Of the agricultural land, 35.8% is used for growing crops and 6.4% is pastures, while 1.4% is used for orchards or vine crops. Of the water in the municipality, 2.1% is in lakes and 0.9% is in rivers and streams.

Safnern lies in the Bernese Seeland at the foot of the Bütten Mountains. It is also along the Nidau-Büren channel as well as the old river bed of the Zihl and Aare rivers.

On 31 December 2009 Amtsbezirk Nidau, the municipality's former district, was dissolved. On the following day, 1 January 2010, it joined the newly created Verwaltungskreis Biel/Bienne.

== Coat of arms ==
The blazon of the municipal coat of arms is Per fess Gules a Pale chevrony Or and Sable and Or a Barrulet wavy Azure and a Mount of 3 Coupeaux Vert.

== Demographics ==
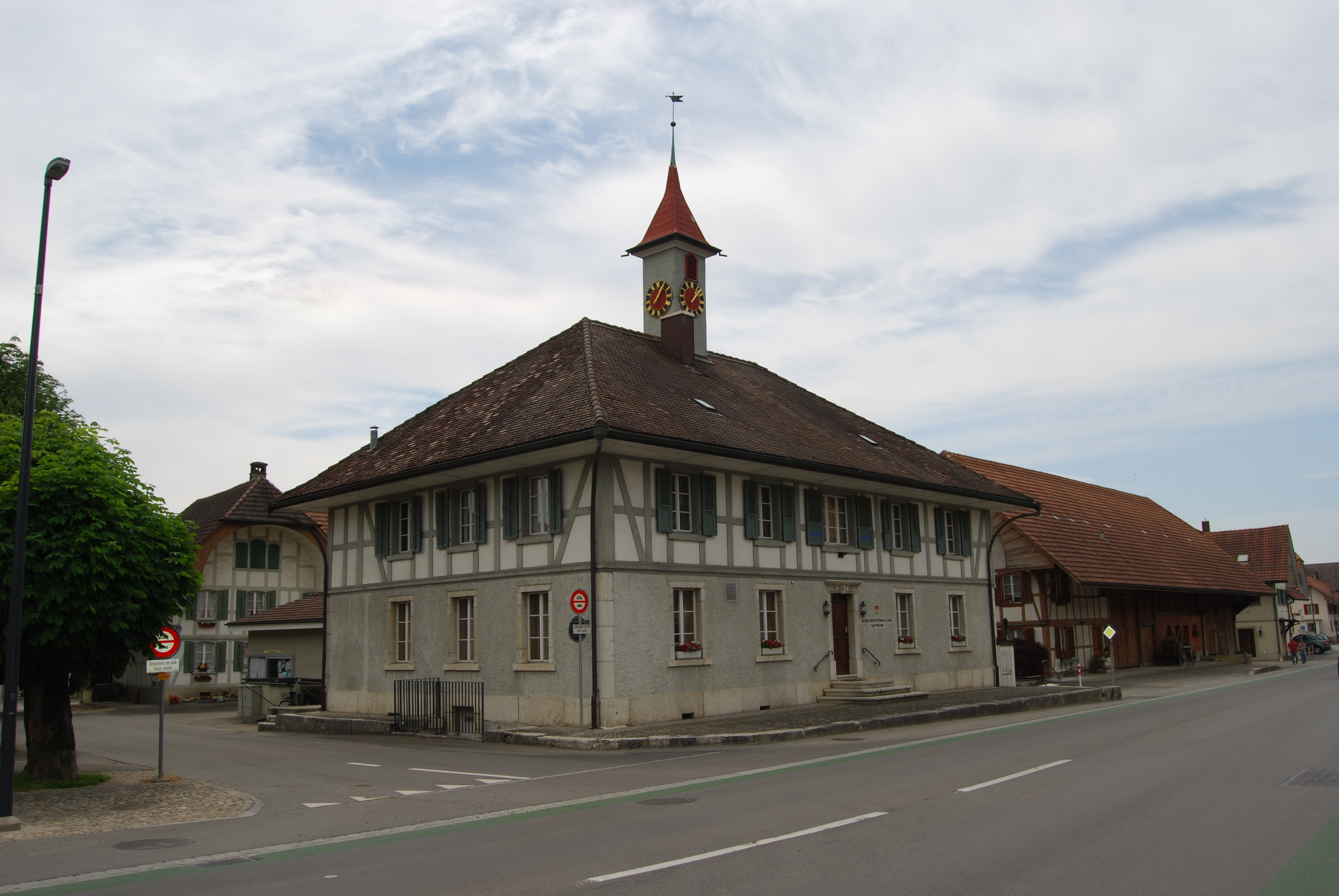
Safnern municipal administration building

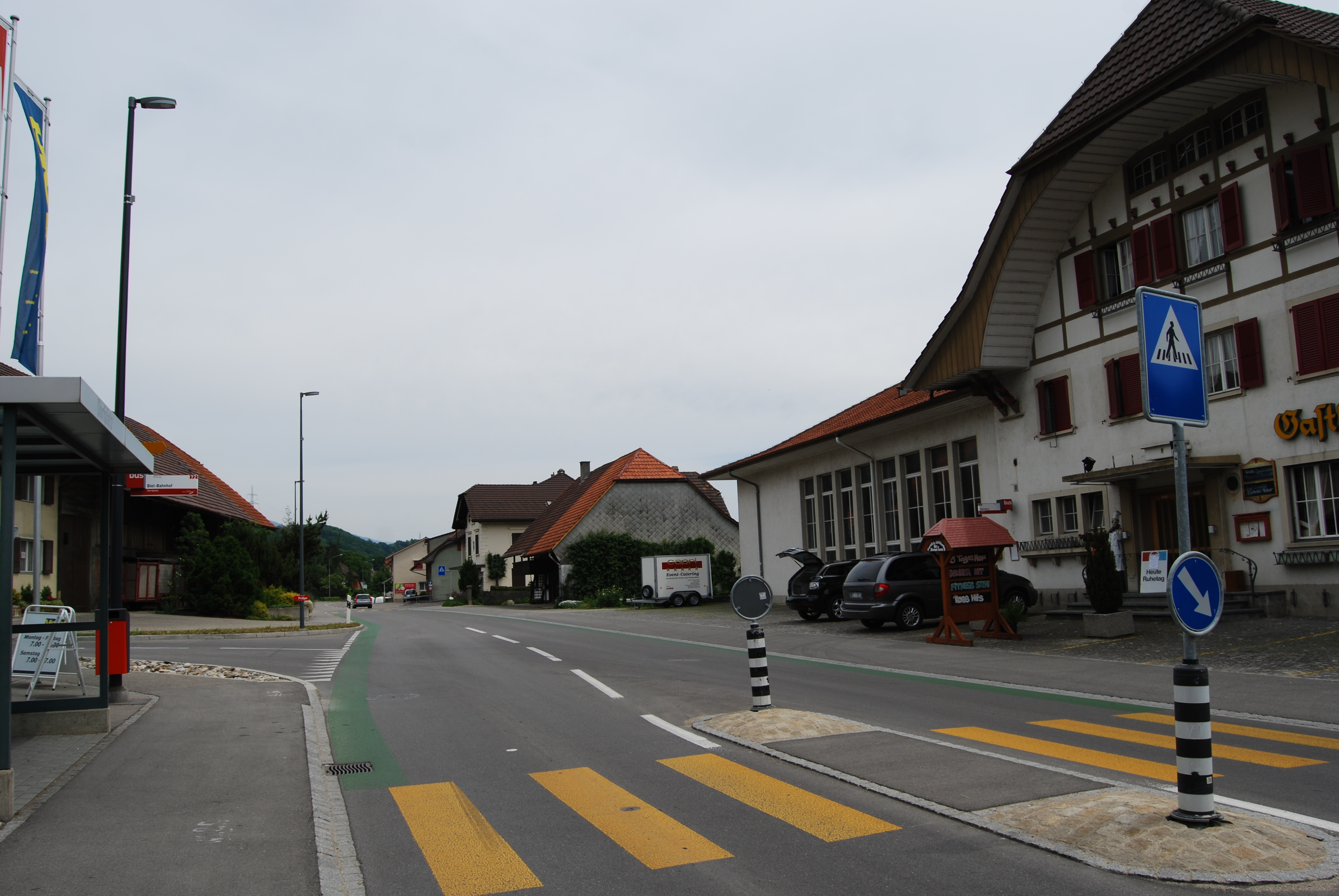
Safnern village

Safnern has a population (as of December 2020) of 1,951. As of 2010, 5.2% of the population are resident foreign nationals. Over the last 10 years (2001-2011) the population has changed at a rate of 0%. Migration accounted for 0.6%, while births and deaths accounted for -0.1%.

Most of the population (as of 2000) speaks German (1,652 or 92.9%) as their first language, French is the second most common (81 or 4.6%) and Italian is the third (14 or 0.8%).

As of 2008, the population was 48.5% male and 51.5% female. The population was made up of 854 Swiss men (45.6% of the population) and 54 (2.9%) non-Swiss men. There were 921 Swiss women (49.2%) and 4 (0.2%) non-Swiss women. Of the population in the municipality, 457 or about 25.7% were born in Safnern and lived there in 2000. There were 827 or 46.5% who were born in the same canton, while 322 or 18.1% were born somewhere else in Switzerland, and 133 or 7.5% were born outside of Switzerland.

As of 2011, children and teenagers (0–19 years old) make up 22.2% of the population, while adults (20–64 years old) make up 58.6% and seniors (over 64 years old) make up 19.2%.

As of 2000, there were 658 people who were single and never married in the municipality. There were 946 married individuals, 92 widows or widowers and 83 individuals who are divorced.

As of 2010, there were 182 households that consist of only one person and 34 households with five or more people. In 2000, a total of 712 apartments (93.7% of the total) were permanently occupied, while 21 apartments (2.8%) were seasonally occupied and 27 apartments (3.6%) were empty. As of 2010, the construction rate of new housing units was 1.6 new units per 1000 residents. The vacancy rate for the municipality, in 2012, was 2.61%. In 2011, single family homes made up 68.8% of the total housing in the municipality.

The historical population is given in the following chart:

== Politics ==
In the 2011 federal election the most popular party was the Swiss People's Party (SVP) which received 37.4% of the vote. The next three most popular parties were the Social Democratic Party (SP) (18.2%), the Conservative Democratic Party (BDP) (17.6%) and the FDP.The Liberals (5.9%). In the federal election, a total of 716 votes were cast, and the voter turnout was 49.9%.

== Economy ==
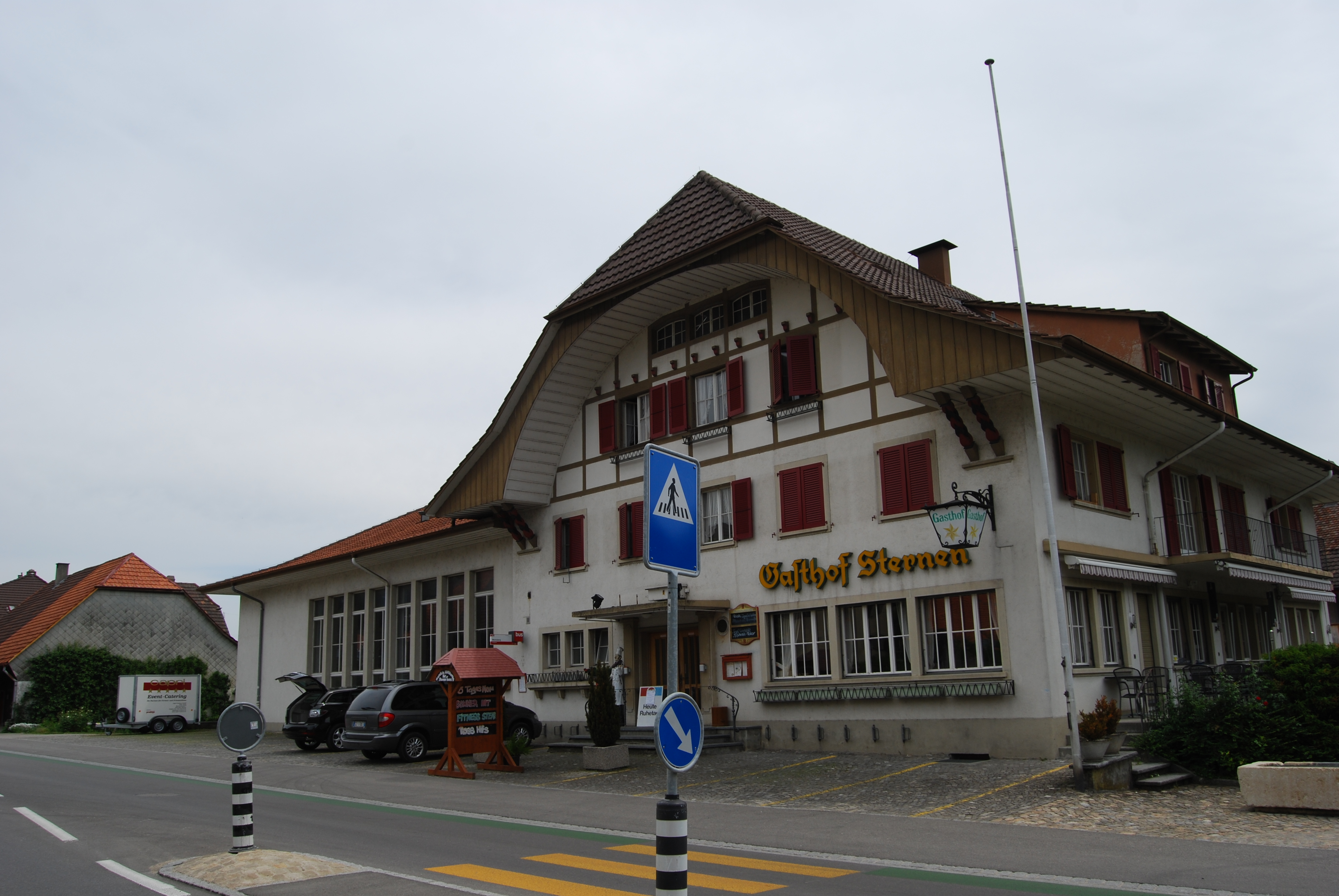
The Gasthof (Hotel/Restaurant) Sternen in Safnern

As of 2011, Safnern had an unemployment rate of 1%. As of 2008, there were a total of 524 people employed in the municipality. Of these, there were 44 people employed in the primary economic sector and about 17 businesses involved in this sector. 298 people were employed in the secondary sector and there were 35 businesses in this sector. 182 people were employed in the tertiary sector, with 38 businesses in this sector. There were 969 residents of the municipality who were employed in some capacity, of which females made up 42.8% of the workforce.

In 2008 there were a total of 444 full-time equivalent jobs. The number of jobs in the primary sector was 32, all of which were in agriculture. The number of jobs in the secondary sector was 271 of which 230 or (84.9%) were in manufacturing, 8 or (3.0%) were in mining and 32 (11.8%) were in construction. The number of jobs in the tertiary sector was 141. In the tertiary sector; 50 or 35.5% were in wholesale or retail sales or the repair of motor vehicles, 7 or 5.0% were in the movement and storage of goods, 14 or 9.9% were in a hotel or restaurant, 4 or 2.8% were technical professionals or scientists, 13 or 9.2% were in education and 26 or 18.4% were in health care.

In 2000, there were 365 workers who commuted into the municipality and 725 workers who commuted away. The municipality is a net exporter of workers, with about 2.0 workers leaving the municipality for every one entering. A total of 244 workers (40.1% of the 609 total workers in the municipality) both lived and worked in Safnern. Of the working population, 13.1% used public transportation to get to work, and 61.7% used a private car.

In 2011 the average local and cantonal tax rate on a married resident, with two children, of Safnern making 150,000 CHF was 12.3%, while an unmarried resident's rate was 18%. For comparison, the rate for the entire canton in the same year, was 14.2% and 22.0%, while the nationwide rate was 12.3% and 21.1% respectively. In 2009 there were a total of 836 tax payers in the municipality. Of that total, 319 made over 75,000 CHF per year. There were 10 people who made between 15,000 and 20,000 per year. The average income of the over 75,000 CHF group in Safnern was 115,579 CHF, while the average across all of Switzerland was 130,478 CHF.

In 2011 a total of 2.8% of the population received direct financial assistance from the government.

== Religion ==
From the 2000 census, 1,238 or 69.6% belonged to the Swiss Reformed Church, while 238 or 13.4% were Roman Catholic. Of the rest of the population, there were 3 members of an Orthodox church (or about 0.17% of the population), there was 1 individual who belongs to the Christian Catholic Church, and there were 66 individuals (or about 3.71% of the population) who belonged to another Christian church. There were 2 individuals (or about 0.11% of the population) who were Jewish, and 23 (or about 1.29% of the population) who were Islamic. There were 2 individuals who were Buddhist and 1 individual who belonged to another church. 156 (or about 8.77% of the population) belonged to no church, are agnostic or atheist, and 49 individuals (or about 2.75% of the population) did not answer the question.

== Education ==
In Safnern about 62.7% of the population have completed non-mandatory upper secondary education, and 19.4% have completed additional higher education (either university or a Fachhochschule). Of the 220 who had completed some form of tertiary schooling listed in the census, 76.8% were Swiss men, 17.3% were Swiss women, 4.5% were non-Swiss men.

The Canton of Bern school system provides one year of non-obligatory Kindergarten, followed by six years of Primary school. This is followed by three years of obligatory lower Secondary school where the students are separated according to ability and aptitude. Following the lower Secondary students may attend additional schooling or they may enter an apprenticeship.

During the 2011-12 school year, there were a total of 154 students attending classes in Safnern. There were 2 kindergarten classes with a total of 28 students in the municipality. Of the kindergarten students, 10.7% were permanent or temporary residents of Switzerland (not citizens) and 14.3% have a different mother language than the classroom language. The municipality had 6 primary classes and 126 students. Of the primary students, 1.6% were permanent or temporary residents of Switzerland (not citizens) and 8.7% have a different mother language than the classroom language.

As of 2000, there were a total of 141 students living and attending any school in the municipality. An additional 115 students from Safnern attended schools outside the municipality.

== Notable people ==
- Friedrich Gottlieb Stebler (1852 in Safnern – 1935) a Swiss agriculturalist and ethnographer.
