= Orpund =

- Municipality
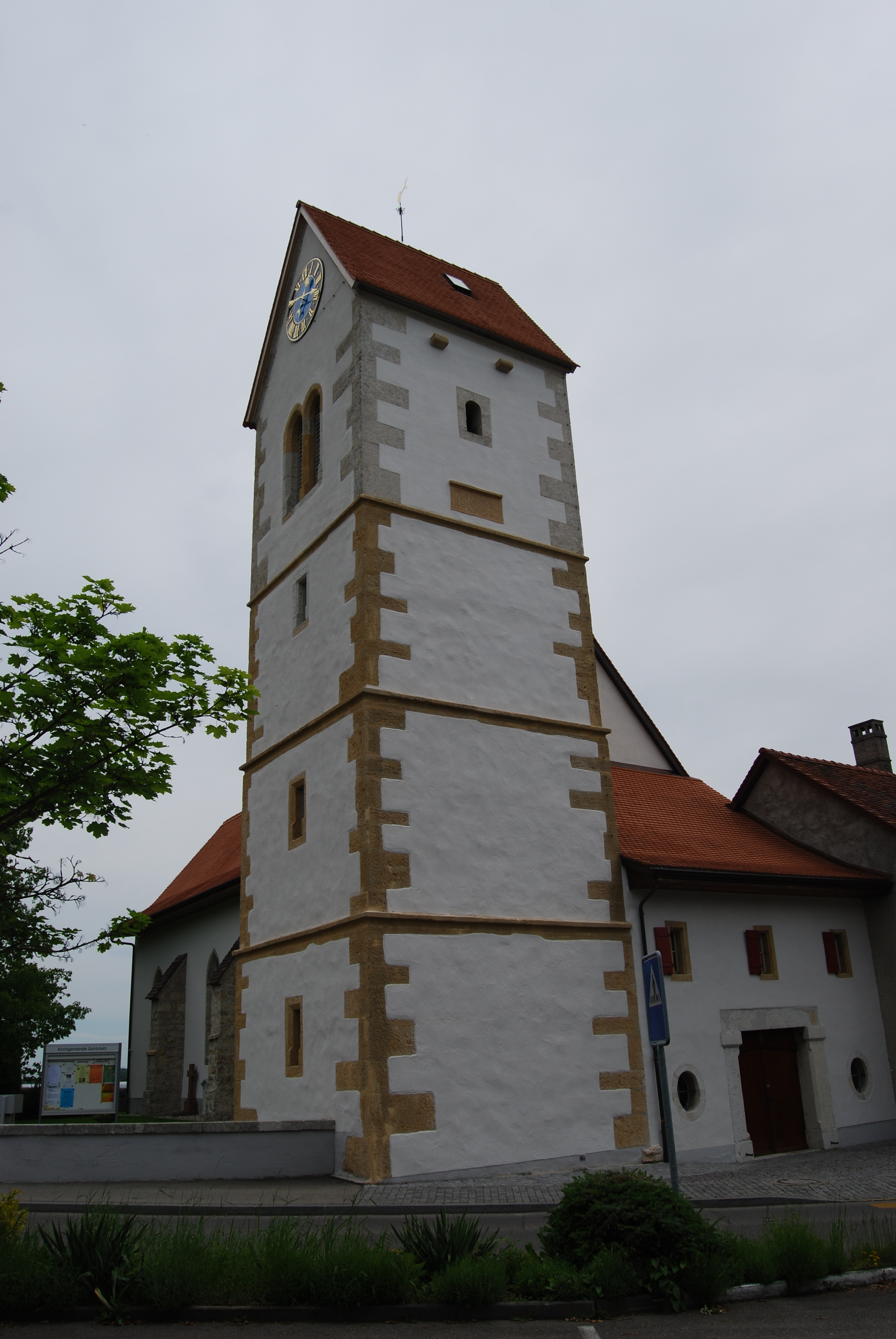
- Gotthouse Monastery Church in Orpund

- Flag Coat of arms
- Location of Orpund
- Location within Switzerland Location within Canton of Bern
- Coordinates: 47°8′N 7°18′E
- Country: Switzerland
- Canton: Bern
- District: Biel/Bienne

Government
  - Executive: Gemeinderat with 5 members
  - Mayor: Gemeindepräsident; Oliver Matti SPS/PSS (as of 2026)

Area
  - Total: 4.0 km^{2} (1.5 sq mi)
- Elevation: 483 m (1,585 ft)

Population (December 2020)
  - Total: 3,052
  - Density: 760/km^{2} (2,000/sq mi)
- Time zone: UTC+01:00 (CET)
  - Summer (DST): UTC+02:00 (CEST)
- Postal code: 2552
- SFOS number: 744
- ISO 3166 code: CH-BE
- Surrounded by: Biel/Bienne, Brügg, Safnern, Scheuren, Schwadernau
- Twin towns: Brtnice (Czech Republic)
- Website: https://www.orpund.ch/

Orpund is a municipality in the Biel/Bienne administrative district in the canton of Bern in Switzerland.

== History ==
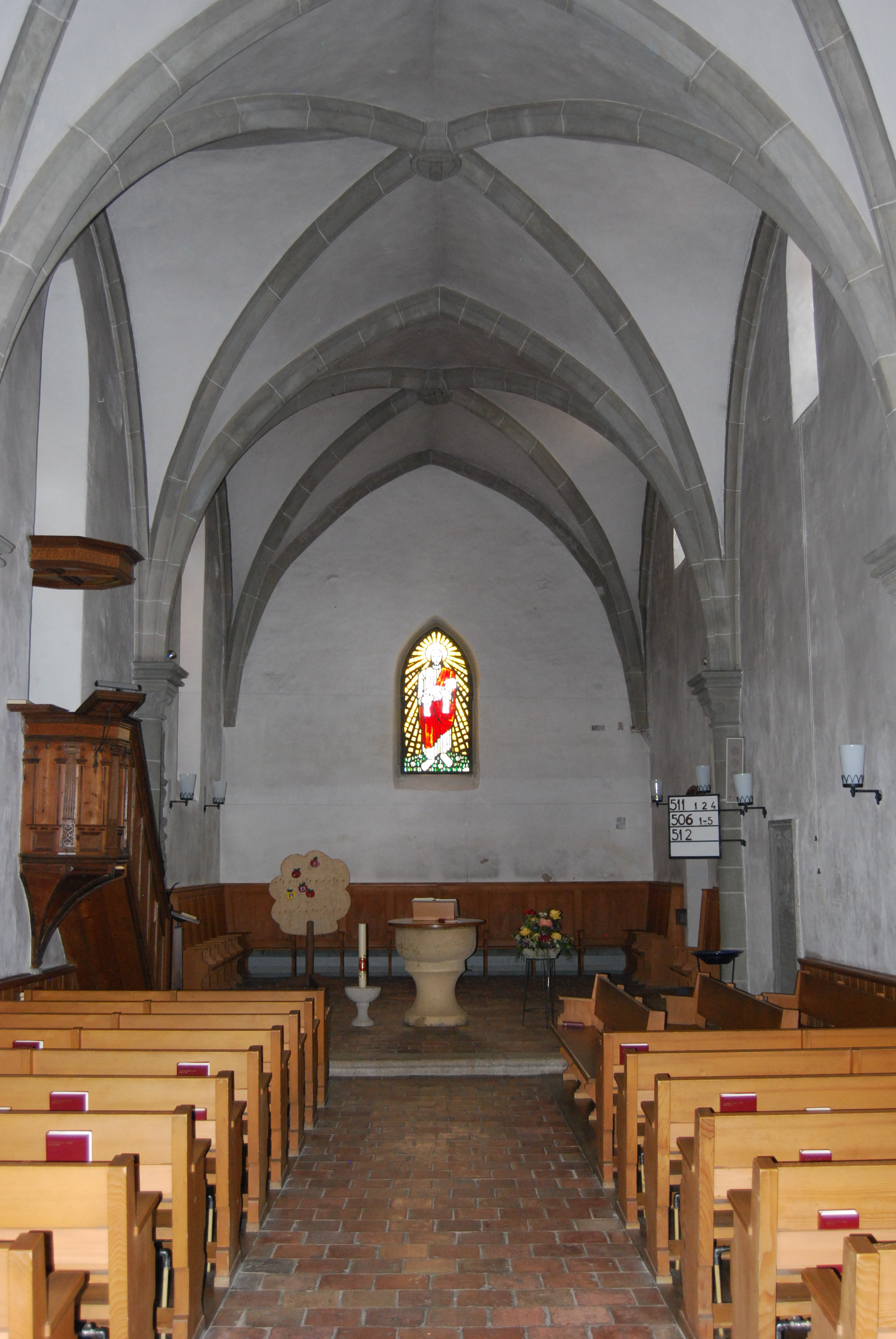
Interior of the Gottstatt Monastery church.

Aerial view of Gottstatt and Orpund (1950)

Orpund is first mentioned in 1255 as Orpunt. The municipality was formerly known by its unknown name er Orpondes, however, that name is no longer used.

The oldest traces of settlements in the area were neolithic, Bronze Age and La Tène era artifacts which were discovered during construction of the Nidau-Büren Canal. A horde of Bronze Age items and a Roman era settlement were found on the Büttenberg. During the Middle Ages, the Counts of Neuchâtel-Nidau founded a monastery at Gottstatt and gave the village of Orpund to the monastery. The village and the monastery jointly owned an island in the Thielle/Zihl river, which they used for fishing. At the end of the 14th century, Bern acquired all the lands around Nidau and Orpund was incorporated into the Bernese bailiwick of Nidau. Part of the village was in the parish of Mett while the rest belonged to the parish church located on the Büttenberg hill near Orpund. During the Protestant Reformation of 1528, Gottstatt Monastery was secularized and the monastery church became the parish church for all of Orpund.

On 8 May 1778 eight houses in the village burned to the ground. After the fire they were all rebuilt. However, the straw roofing and close quarters made another fire almost inevitable. On 24 February 1868 three houses were destroyed in a fire. This was followed by a major fire on 26 May 1868 which destroyed 26 houses and damaged several others. According to an 1808 survey, there were about 40 houses in the entire village.

The Jura water correction projects of 1868-75 diverted the Aare river into Lake Biel and built the Nidau-Büren Canal through Orpund. The canal drained the Orpundmoos marsh and reduced flooding in the village. However, the changed river course also changed the border between Orpund and the neighboring municipality of Schwadernau. Orpund was generally rural and agrarian until the 1950s when it became a suburb of Biel/Bienne. Both the population and industry increased rapidly in the municipality after the 1950s. A number of new housing developments sprang up around Orpund in the 1960s. A municipal school opened in 1970, with students coming from several surrounding municipalities. Today, many of the residents commute to jobs in Biel or other nearby cities. In 2005, industry still provides about 60% of all jobs in Orpund, while the services sector makes up 37%.

== Geography ==
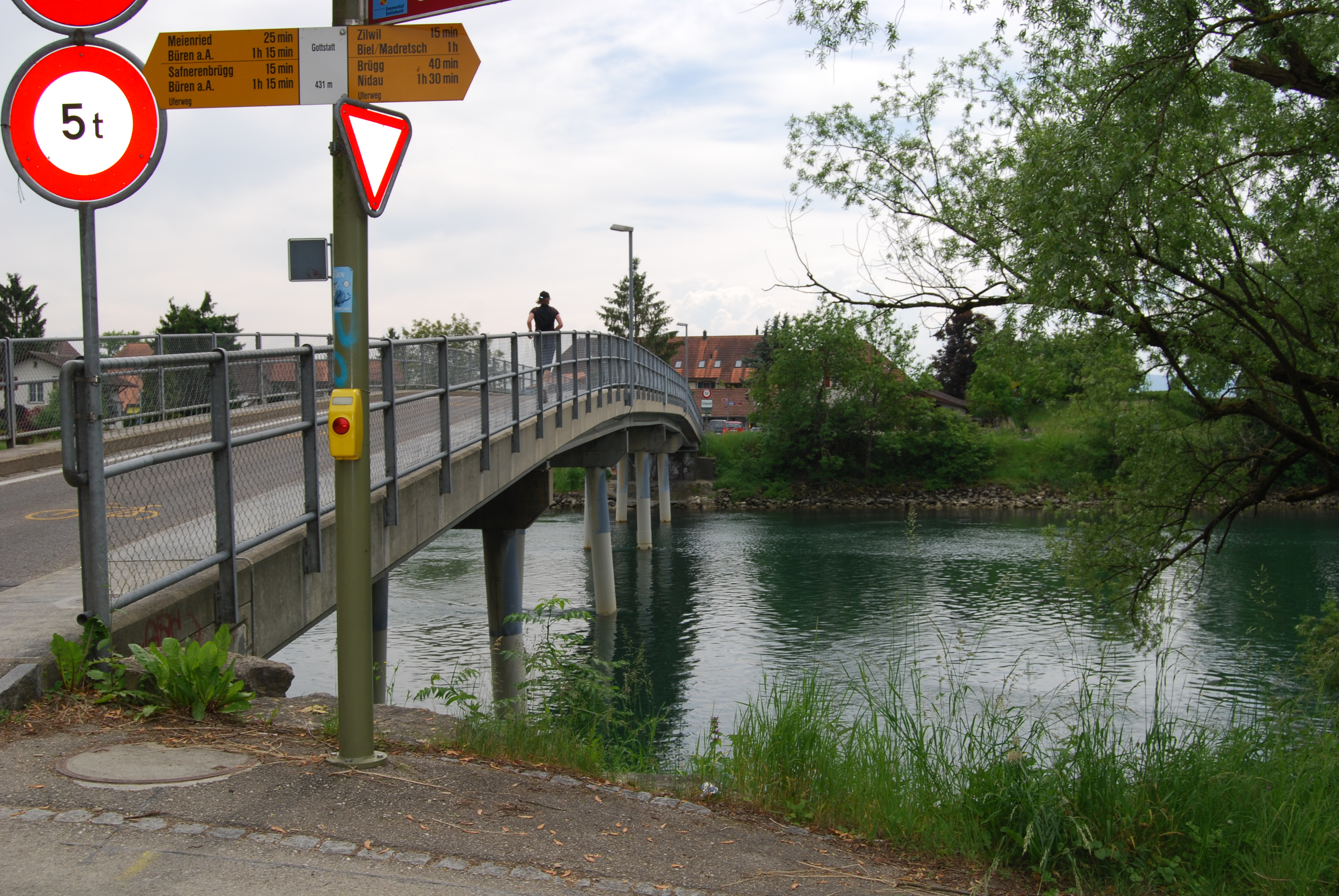
Nidau-Buren Canal in Orpund

Orpund has an area of 3.97 km^{2} (1.53 sq mi). As of 2012, a total of 1.55 km^{2} (0.60 mi^{2}) or 39.1% is used for agricultural purposes, while 1.48 km^{2} (0.57 mi^{2}) or 37.4% is forested. Of the rest of the land, 0.82 km^{2} (0.32 mi^{2}) or 20.7% is settled (buildings or roads), 0.09 km^{2} (22 acres) or 2.3% is either rivers or lakes and 0.01 km^{2} (2.5 acres) or 0.3% is unproductive land.

During the same year, industrial buildings made up 1.8% of the total area while housing and buildings made up 14.9% and transportation infrastructure made up 3.0%. Out of the forested land, all of the forested land area is covered with heavy forests. Of the agricultural land, 30.6% is used for growing crops and 7.1% is pastures, while 1.5% is used for orchards or vine crops. All the water in the municipality is flowing water.

Orpund is located on the left bank of the Nidau-Büren channel. It includes the village of Orpund, the site of the former Gottstatt Monastery and the hamlet Zihlwil.

On 31 December 2009 Amtsbezirk Nidau, the municipality's former district, was dissolved. On the following day, 1 January 2010, it joined the newly created Verwaltungskreis Biel/Bienne.

== Coat of arms ==
The blazon of the municipal coat of arms is Gules an Oar and a Pike both Or in saltire.

== Demographics ==
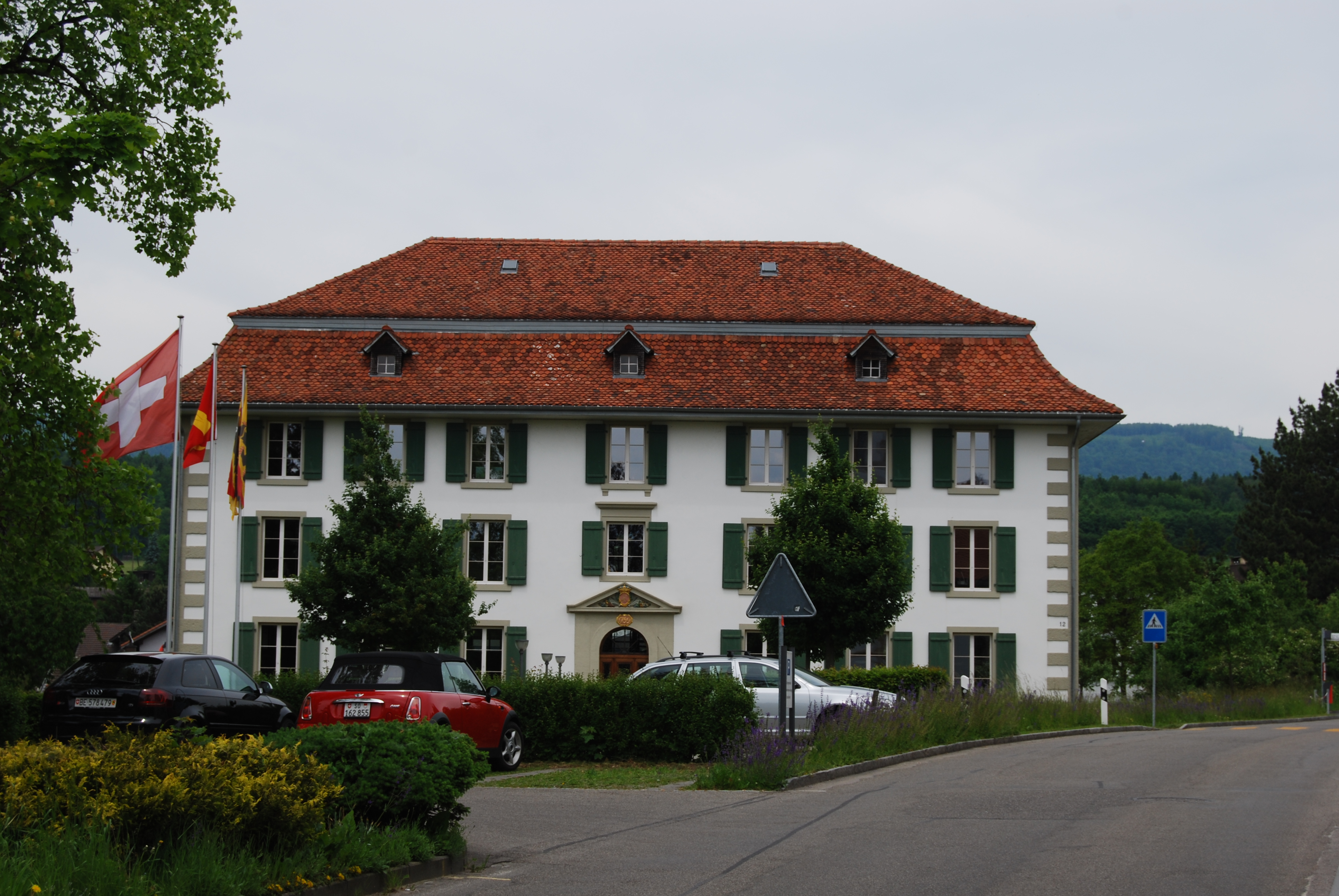
Former Granary of Orpund, today the municipal administration building.

Orpund has a population (as of December 2020) of 3,052. As of 2010, 15.0% of the population are resident foreign nationals. Over the last 10 years (2001-2011) the population has changed at a rate of -1.6%. Migration accounted for -1.9%, while births and deaths accounted for 0%.

Most of the population (as of 2000) speaks German (2,168 or 86.7%) as their first language, French is the second most common (166 or 6.6%) and Italian is the third (37 or 1.5%). There is 1 person who speaks Romansh.

As of 2008, the population was 50.1% male and 49.9% female. The population was made up of 1,117 Swiss men (41.8% of the population) and 222 (8.3%) non-Swiss men. There were 1,154 Swiss women (43.2%) and 17 (0.6%) non-Swiss women. Of the population in the municipality, 530 or about 21.2% were born in Orpund and lived there in 2000. There were 1,109 or 44.3% who were born in the same canton, while 448 or 17.9% were born somewhere else in Switzerland, and 303 or 12.1% were born outside of Switzerland.

As of 2011, children and teenagers (0–19 years old) make up 19.9% of the population, while adults (20–64 years old) make up 59.4% and seniors (over 64 years old) make up 20.7%.

As of 2000, there were 915 people who were single and never married in the municipality. There were 1,289 married individuals, 140 widows or widowers and 158 individuals who are divorced.

As of 2010, there were 371 households that consist of only one person and 53 households with five or more people. In 2000, a total of 1,071 apartments (89.8% of the total) were permanently occupied, while 70 apartments (5.9%) were seasonally occupied and 51 apartments (4.3%) were empty. As of 2010, the construction rate of new housing units was 1.1 new units per 1000 residents. The vacancy rate for the municipality, in 2012, was 3.73%. In 2011, single family homes made up 65.7% of the total housing in the municipality.

The historical population is given in the following chart:

== Sights ==
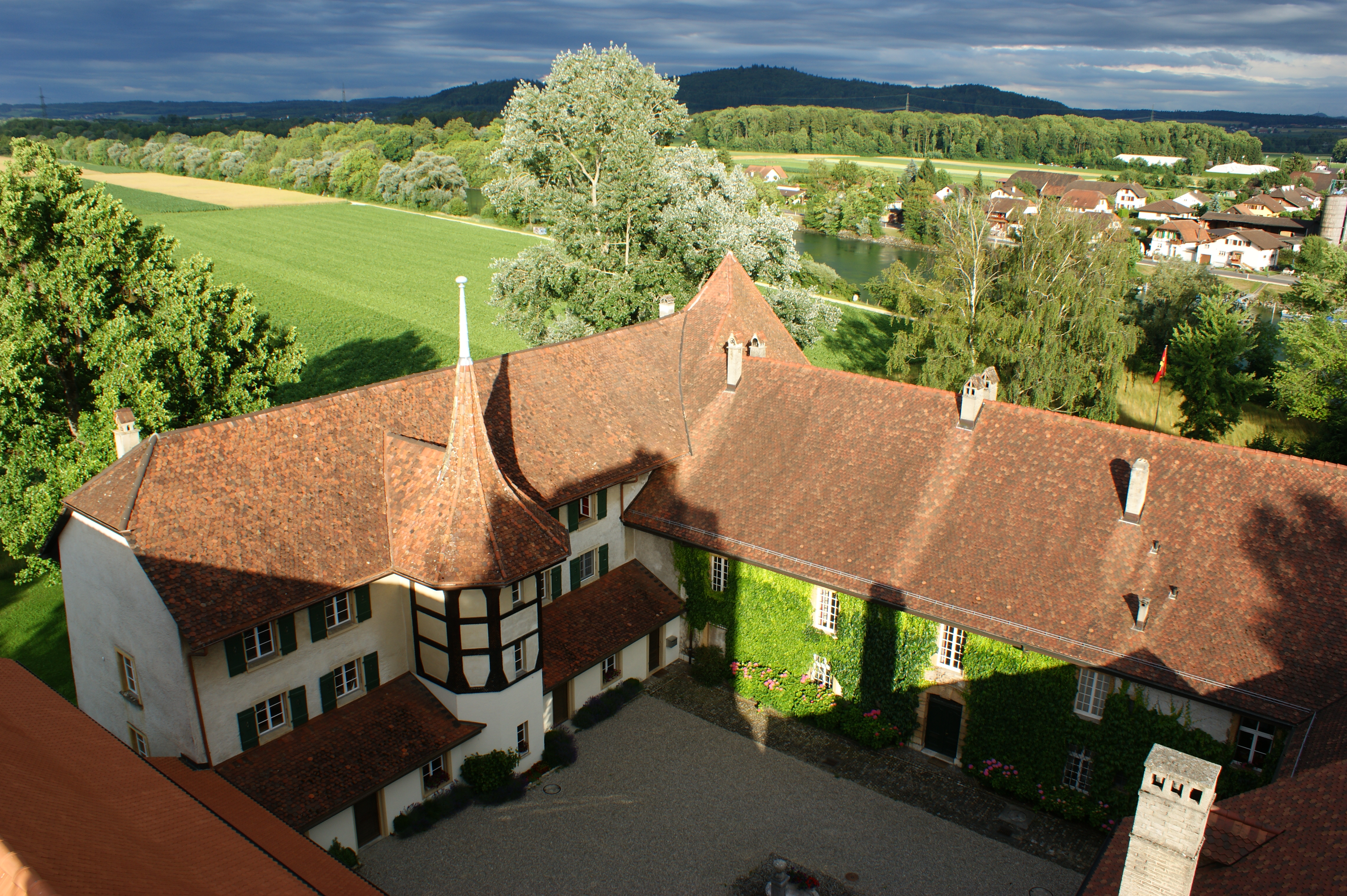
Gottstatt Monastery grounds

The entire Gottstatt Monastery area is designated as part of the Inventory of Swiss Heritage Sites.

== Politics ==
In the 2011 federal election the most popular party was the Swiss People's Party (SVP) which received 35.2% of the vote. The next three most popular parties were the Social Democratic Party (SP) (23.5%), the Conservative Democratic Party (BDP) (13.3%) and the FDP.The Liberals (6.5%). In the federal election, a total of 816 votes were cast, and the voter turnout was 43.6%.

== Economy ==
As of 2011, Orpund had an unemployment rate of 2%. As of 2008, there were a total of 747 people employed in the municipality. Of these, there were 22 people employed in the primary economic sector and about 7 businesses involved in this sector. 426 people were employed in the secondary sector and there were 30 businesses in this sector. 299 people were employed in the tertiary sector, with 55 businesses in this sector. There were 1,350 residents of the municipality who were employed in some capacity, of which females made up 43.5% of the workforce.

In 2008 there were a total of 638 full-time equivalent jobs. The number of jobs in the primary sector was 15, all of which were in agriculture. The number of jobs in the secondary sector was 390 of which 256 or (65.6%) were in manufacturing and 134 (34.4%) were in construction. The number of jobs in the tertiary sector was 233. In the tertiary sector; 98 or 42.1% were in wholesale or retail sales or the repair of motor vehicles, 13 or 5.6% were in the movement and storage of goods, 16 or 6.9% were in a hotel or restaurant, 3 or 1.3% were the insurance or financial industry, 39 or 16.7% were technical professionals or scientists, 31 or 13.3% were in education and 5 or 2.1% were in health care.

In 2000, there were 537 workers who commuted into the municipality and 1,061 workers who commuted away. The municipality is a net exporter of workers, with about 2.0 workers leaving the municipality for every one entering. A total of 289 workers (35.0% of the 826 total workers in the municipality) both lived and worked in Orpund. Of the working population, 18.7% used public transportation to get to work, and 57.6% used a private car.

In 2011 the average local and cantonal tax rate on a married resident, with two children, of Orpund making 150,000 CHF was 13.2%, while an unmarried resident's rate was 19.3%. For comparison, the rate for the entire canton in the same year, was 14.2% and 22.0%, while the nationwide rate was 12.3% and 21.1% respectively. In 2009 there were a total of 1,173 tax payers in the municipality. Of that total, 381 made over 75,000 CHF per year. There were 9 people who made between 15,000 and 20,000 per year. The average income of the over 75,000 CHF group in Orpund was 112,197 CHF, while the average across all of Switzerland was 130,478 CHF.

In 2011 a total of 5.3% of the population received direct financial assistance from the government.

Established in 1977, the organisation Suisse Tiers Monde and OS3 are two projects initiated by Erklärung von Bern EvB, and thereupon labelled as claro fair trade based in Orpun, that is among other sustainable initiatives financially supported by the Alternative Bank Schweiz ABS. The claro products are distributed in claro and associated Weltläden shops in Switzerland.

== Religion ==
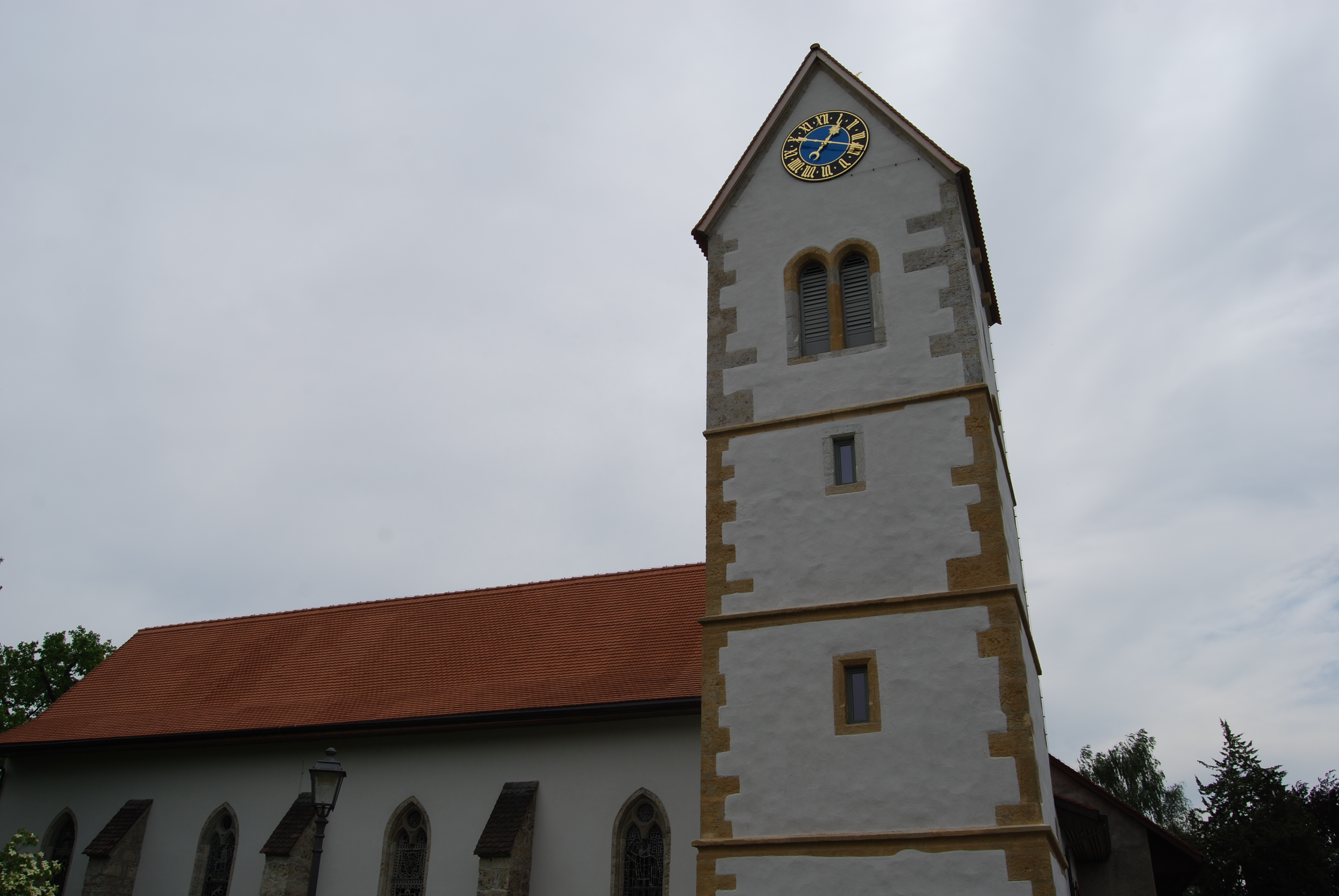
Former Gottstatt Monastery church, now the Reformed parish church.

From the 2000 census, 1,627 or 65.0% belonged to the Swiss Reformed Church, while 363 or 14.5% were Roman Catholic. Of the rest of the population, there were 10 members of an Orthodox church (or about 0.40% of the population), there were 6 individuals (or about 0.24% of the population) who belonged to the Christian Catholic Church, and there were 56 individuals (or about 2.24% of the population) who belonged to another Christian church. There were 5 individuals (or about 0.20% of the population) who were Jewish, and 67 (or about 2.68% of the population) who were Islamic. There were 17 individuals who were Buddhist, 7 individuals who were Hindu and 1 individual who belonged to another church. 225 (or about 8.99% of the population) belonged to no church, are agnostic or atheist, and 118 individuals (or about 4.72% of the population) did not answer the question.

== Education ==
In Orpund about 57.6% of the population have completed non-mandatory upper secondary education, and 15.7% have completed additional higher education (either university or a Fachhochschule). Of the 266 who had completed some form of tertiary schooling listed in the census, 73.7% were Swiss men, 18.0% were Swiss women, 6.4% were non-Swiss men and 1.9% were non-Swiss women.

The Canton of Bern school system provides one year of non-obligatory Kindergarten, followed by six years of Primary school. This is followed by three years of obligatory lower Secondary school where the students are separated according to ability and aptitude. Following the lower Secondary students may attend additional schooling or they may enter an apprenticeship.

During the 2011-12 school year, there were a total of 382 students attending classes in Orpund. There were 2 kindergarten classes with a total of 39 students in the municipality. Of the kindergarten students, 12.8% were permanent or temporary residents of Switzerland (not citizens) and 23.1% have a different mother language than the classroom language. The municipality had 8 primary classes and 148 students. Of the primary students, 20.3% were permanent or temporary residents of Switzerland (not citizens) and 30.4% have a different mother language than the classroom language. During the same year, there were 10 lower secondary classes with a total of 195 students. There were 8.7% who were permanent or temporary residents of Switzerland (not citizens) and 13.3% have a different mother language than the classroom language.

As of 2000, there were a total of 357 students attending any school in the municipality. Of those, 240 both lived and attended school in the municipality, while 117 students came from another municipality. During the same year, 71 residents attended schools outside the municipality.
