= Scheuren, Switzerland =

Scheuren
- Municipality
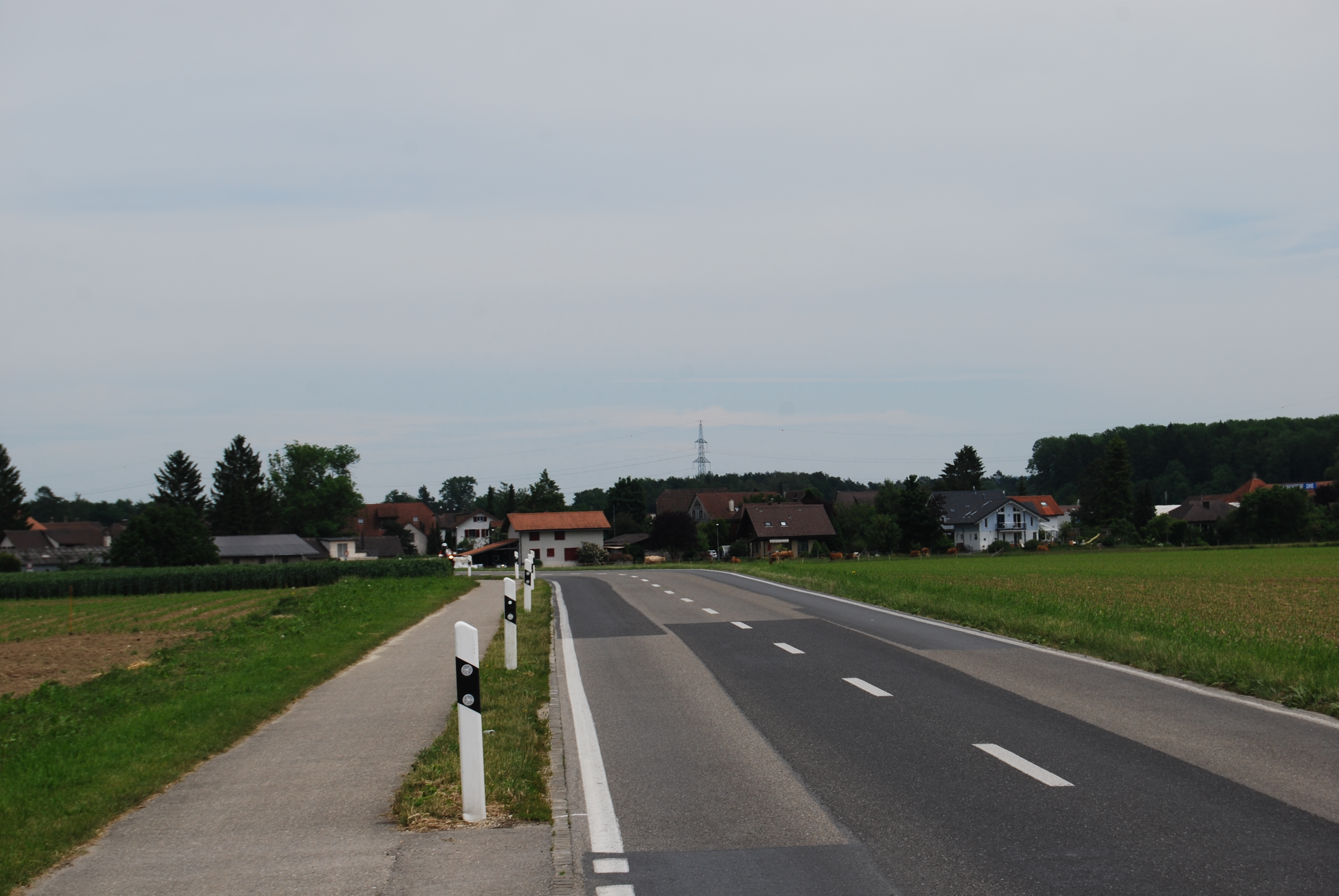

- Flag Coat of arms
- Location of Scheuren
- Location within Switzerland Location within Canton of Bern
- Coordinates: 47°8′N 7°19′E
- Country: Switzerland
- Canton: Bern
- District: Biel/Bienne

Government
  - Executive: Gemeinderat with 5 members
  - Mayor: Gemeindepräsident; Andreas Minder (as of 2026)

Area
  - Total: 2.1 km^{2} (0.81 sq mi)
- Elevation: 430 m (1,410 ft)

Population (December 2020)
  - Total: 475
  - Density: 230/km^{2} (590/sq mi)
- Time zone: UTC+01:00 (CET)
  - Summer (DST): UTC+02:00 (CEST)
- Postal code: 2556
- SFOS number: 747
- ISO 3166 code: CH-BE
- Surrounded by: Dotzigen, Meienried, Orpund, Safnern, Schwadernau
- Website: www.scheuren.ch

Scheuren is a municipality in the Biel/Bienne administrative district in the canton of Bern in Switzerland.

== History ==
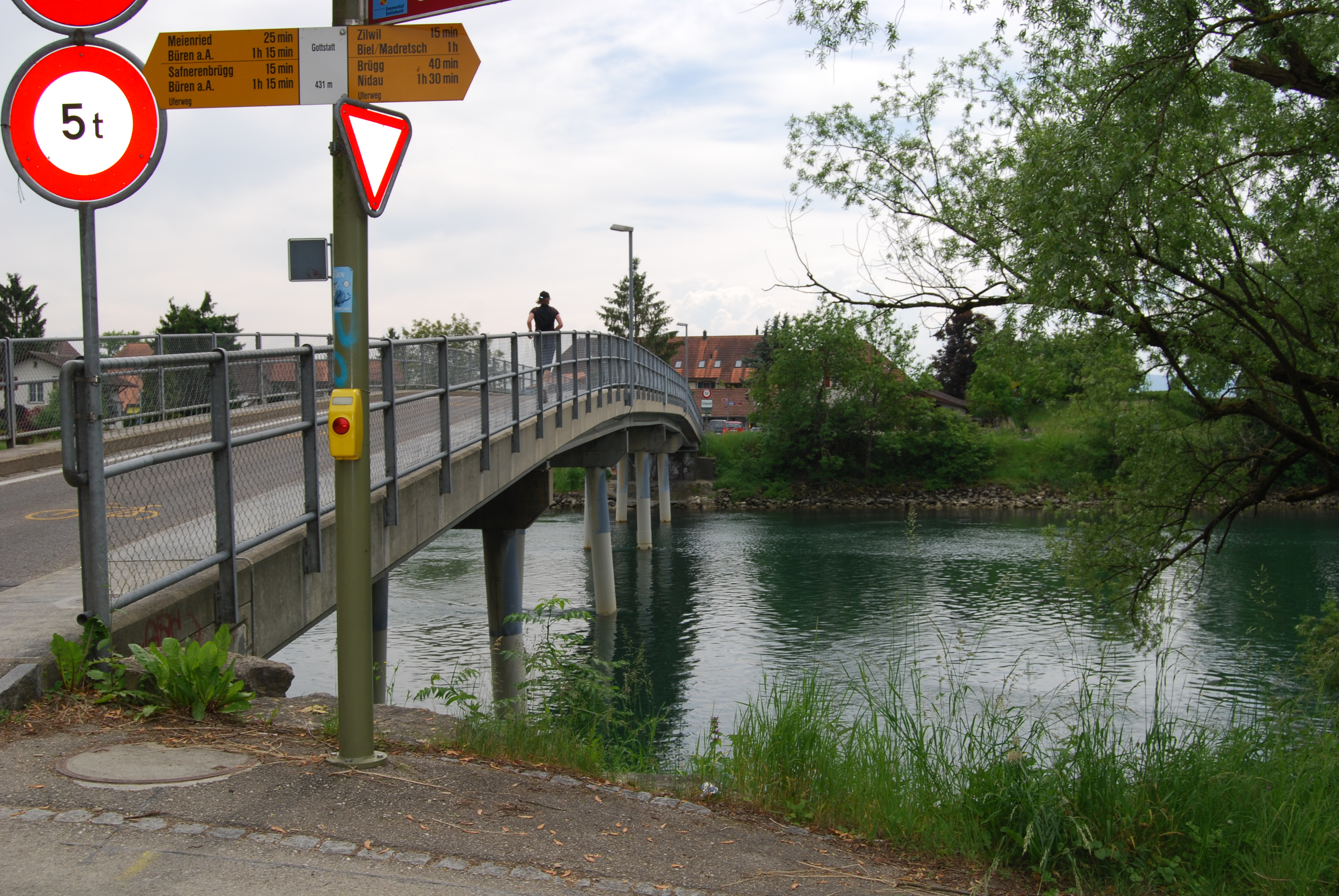
Bridge over the Nidau-Büren Canal, between Scheuren and Orpund

Scheuren is first mentioned in 1398 as Schüren.

The village of Scheuren was given around 1255 to Gottstatt Abbey by the Counts of Neuchâtel-Nidau. Around the end of the 14th century the village was acquired by the city of Bern. Under Bernese rule it was incorporated into the bailiwick of Nidau and was the seat of a low court that had jurisdiction over several neighboring villages. Originally it was part of the parish of Büttenberg, but after the Protestant Reformation of 1528 it became part of the new parish of Gottstatt.

The village was built along the Zihl/Thielle river, which periodically flooded, damaging buildings or fields. Most of the residents made their living from farming or fishing in the river. The diversion of the river and the construction of the Nidau-Büren Canal, in 1868-75, removed the flood risk and opened up additional farm land. In 1925 a bridge connected Scheuren with the neighboring municipality of Orpund. Today, despite Biel's proximity, Scheuren has remained largely an agricultural village, with a couple of small factories and businesses. In 1970 the second tennis center in Switzerland was built in Scheuren.

== Geography ==
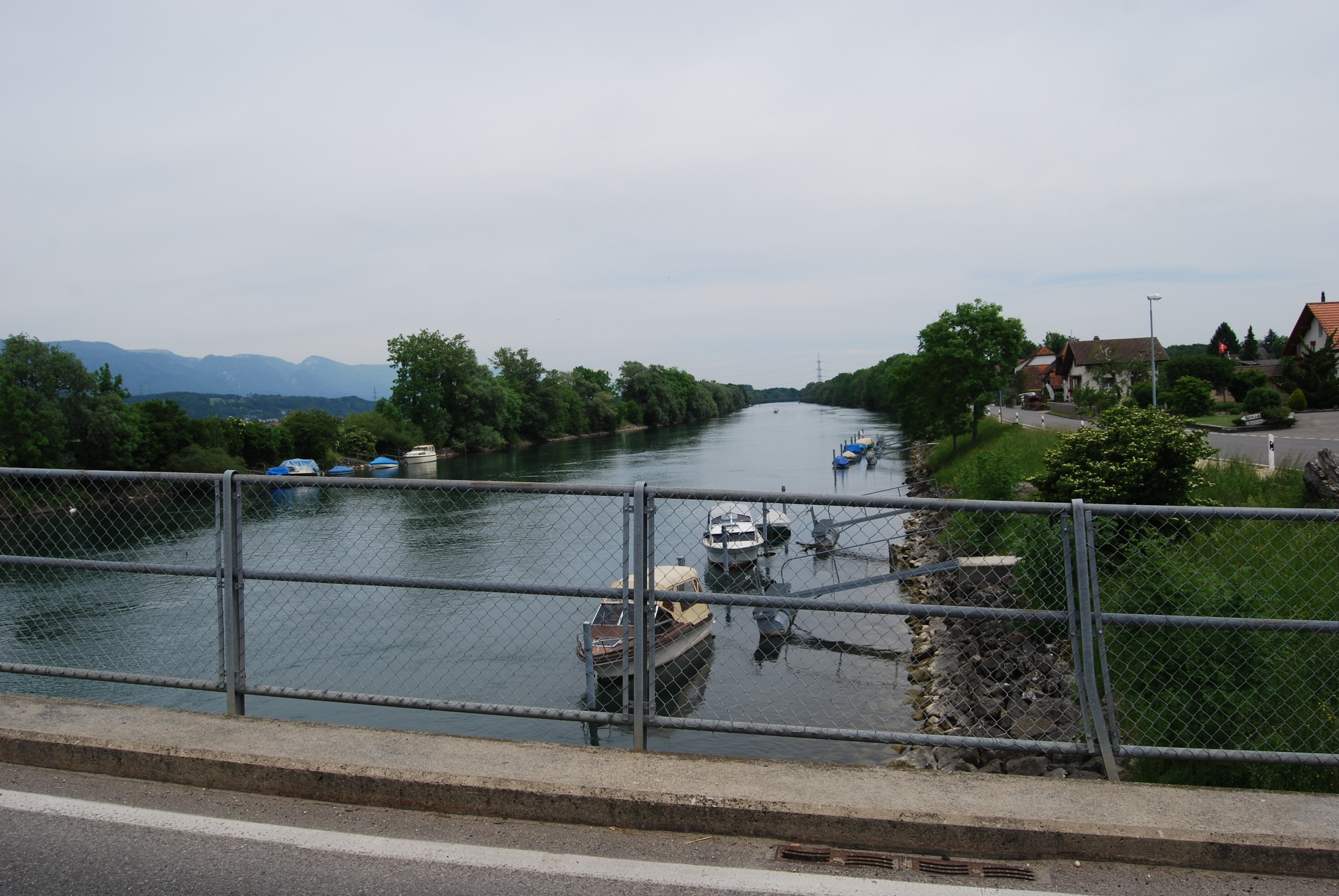
The Nidau-Büren Canal, between Scheuren and Orpund

Scheuren has an area of 2.11 km^{2} (0.81 sq mi). As of 2012, a total of 1.17 km^{2} (0.45 mi^{2}) or 55.7% is used for agricultural purposes, while 0.54 km^{2} (0.21 mi^{2}) or 25.7% is forested. Of the rest of the land, 0.22 km^{2} (0.085 mi^{2}) or 10.5% is settled (buildings or roads), 0.06 km^{2} (15 acres) or 2.9% is either rivers or lakes and 0.11 km^{2} (27 acres) or 5.2% is unproductive land.

During the same year, housing and buildings made up 5.7% and transportation infrastructure made up 3.8%. Out of the forested land, 24.3% of the total land area is heavily forested and 1.4% is covered with orchards or small clusters of trees. Of the agricultural land, 43.3% is used for growing crops and 10.5% is pastures, while 1.9% is used for orchards or vine crops. Of the water in the municipality, 0.5% is in lakes and 2.4% is in rivers and streams.

The municipality is located along the right bank of the Nidau-Büren Canal and along the old river course of the Zihl/Thielle river.

On 31 December 2009 Amtsbezirk Nidau, the municipality's former district, was dissolved. On the following day, 1 January 2010, it joined the newly created Verwaltungskreis Biel/Bienne.

== Coat of arms ==
The blazon of the municipal coat of arms is Azure three Barns Or. The barns (German: Scheunen or German: Scheuern) make this an example of canting arms.

== Demographics ==
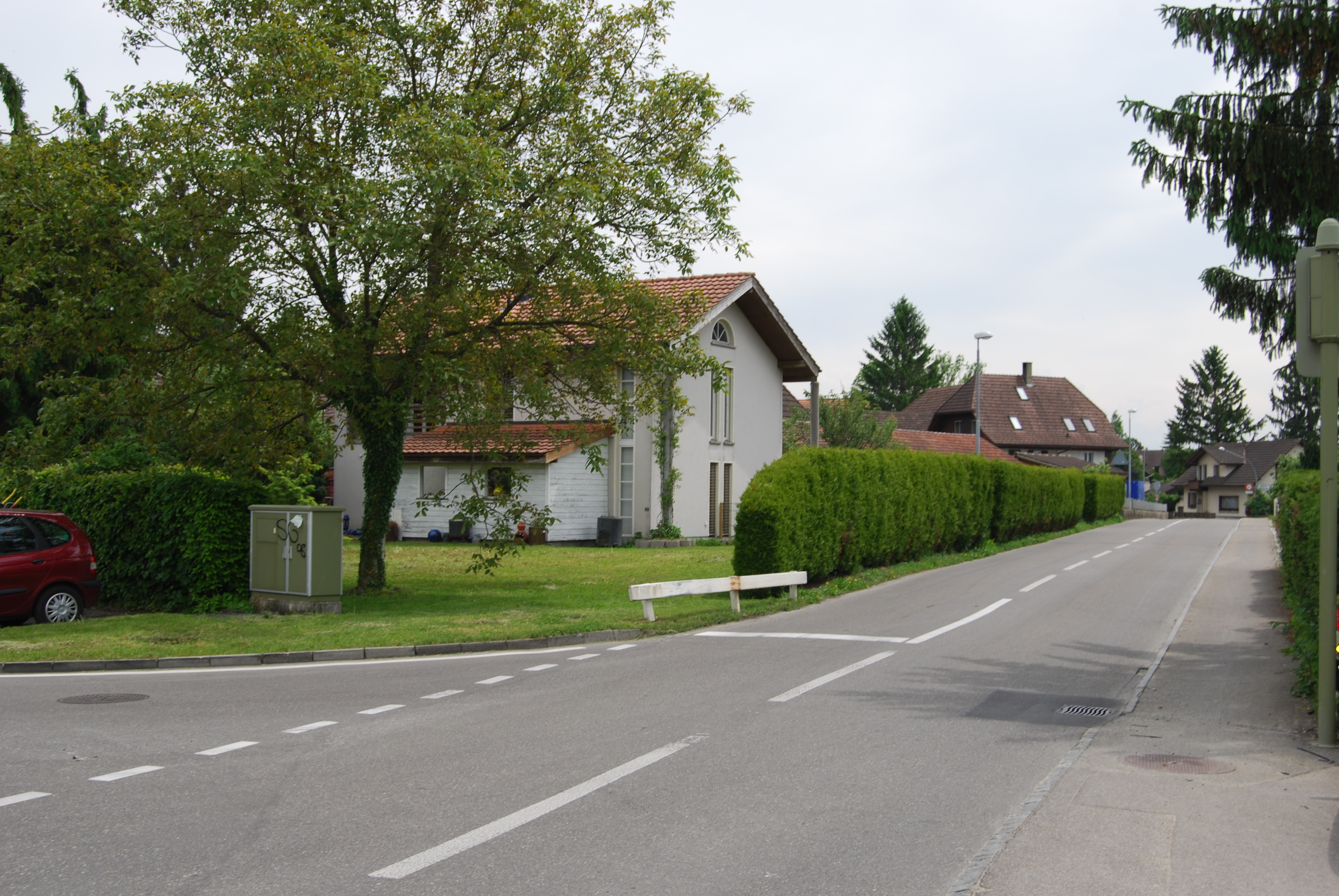
Houses in Scheuren village

Scheuren has a population (as of December 2020) of 475. As of 2010, 1.8% of the population are resident foreign nationals. Over the last 10 years (2001-2011) the population has changed at a rate of 2.1%. Migration accounted for 1.6%, while births and deaths accounted for 0%.

Most of the population (as of 2000) speaks German (398 or 94.5%) as their first language, French is the second most common (19 or 4.5%) and Italian is the third (2 or 0.5%).

As of 2008, the population was 48.0% male and 52.0% female. The population was made up of 203 Swiss men (46.7% of the population) and 6 (1.4%) non-Swiss men. There were 224 Swiss women (51.5%) and 2 (0.5%) non-Swiss women. Of the population in the municipality, 118 or about 28.0% were born in Scheuren and lived there in 2000. There were 206 or 48.9% who were born in the same canton, while 62 or 14.7% were born somewhere else in Switzerland, and 16 or 3.8% were born outside of Switzerland.

As of 2011, children and teenagers (0–19 years old) make up 25% of the population, while adults (20–64 years old) make up 60.8% and seniors (over 64 years old) make up 14.2%.

As of 2000, there were 169 people who were single and never married in the municipality. There were 219 married individuals, 20 widows or widowers and 13 individuals who are divorced.

As of 2010, there were 34 households that consist of only one person and 13 households with five or more people. In 2000, a total of 157 apartments (95.7% of the total) were permanently occupied, while 6 apartments (3.7%) were seasonally occupied and one apartment was empty. As of 2010, the construction rate of new housing units was 9.2 new units per 1000 residents. In 2011, single family homes made up 71.6% of the total housing in the municipality.

The historical population is given in the following chart:

== Politics ==
In the 2011 federal election the most popular party was the Swiss People's Party (SVP) which received 40.4% of the vote. The next three most popular parties were the Conservative Democratic Party (BDP) (17.5%), the Social Democratic Party (SP) (13.7%) and the Green Party (7.9%). In the federal election, a total of 174 votes were cast, and the voter turnout was 51.8%.

== Economy ==
As of 2011, Scheuren had an unemployment rate of 2.16%. As of 2008, there were a total of 138 people employed in the municipality. Of these, there were 32 people employed in the primary economic sector and about 10 businesses involved in this sector. 53 people were employed in the secondary sector and there were 5 businesses in this sector. 53 people were employed in the tertiary sector, with 9 businesses in this sector. There were 226 residents of the municipality who were employed in some capacity, of which females made up 42.9% of the workforce.

In 2008 there were a total of 100 full-time equivalent jobs. The number of jobs in the primary sector was 19, all of which were in agriculture. The number of jobs in the secondary sector was 45 of which 43 or (95.6%) were in manufacturing and 2 (4.4%) were in construction. The number of jobs in the tertiary sector was 36. In the tertiary sector; 9 or 25.0% were in wholesale or retail sales or the repair of motor vehicles, 3 or 8.3% were in a hotel or restaurant, 7 or 19.4% were in education.

In 2000, there were 57 workers who commuted into the municipality and 194 workers who commuted away. The municipality is a net exporter of workers, with about 3.4 workers leaving the municipality for every one entering. A total of 32 workers (36.0% of the 89 total workers in the municipality) both lived and worked in Scheuren.

Of the working population, 10.6% used public transportation to get to work, and 76.1% used a private car.

In 2011 the average local and cantonal tax rate on a married resident, with two children, of Scheuren making 150,000 CHF was 13%, while an unmarried resident's rate was 19.1%. For comparison, the rate for the entire canton in the same year, was 14.2% and 22.0%, while the nationwide rate was 12.3% and 21.1% respectively. In 2009 there were a total of 178 tax payers in the municipality. Of that total, 67 made over 75,000 CHF per year. There were 4 people who made between 15,000 and 20,000 per year. The average income of the over 75,000 CHF group in Scheuren was 109,148 CHF, while the average across all of Switzerland was 130,478 CHF.

In 2011 a total of 0.5% of the population received direct financial assistance from the government.

== Religion ==
From the 2000 census, 317 or 75.3% belonged to the Swiss Reformed Church, while 37 or 8.8% were Roman Catholic. Of the rest of the population, there were 2 members of an Orthodox church (or about 0.48% of the population), and there were 10 individuals (or about 2.38% of the population) who belonged to another Christian church. There was 1 person who was Buddhist and 2 individuals who belonged to another church. 38 (or about 9.03% of the population) belonged to no church, are agnostic or atheist, and 14 individuals (or about 3.33% of the population) did not answer the question.

== Education ==
In Scheuren about 62.2% of the population have completed non-mandatory upper secondary education, and 19.7% have completed additional higher education (either university or a Fachhochschule). Of the 52 who had completed some form of tertiary schooling listed in the census, 71.2% were Swiss men, 21.2% were Swiss women.

The Canton of Bern school system provides one year of non-obligatory Kindergarten, followed by six years of Primary school. This is followed by three years of obligatory lower Secondary school where the students are separated according to ability and aptitude. Following the lower Secondary students may attend additional schooling or they may enter an apprenticeship.

During the 2011-12 school year, there were a total of 46 students attending classes in Scheuren. There were no kindergarten classes in the municipality. The municipality had 2 primary classes and 46 students. Of the primary students, 2.2% were permanent or temporary residents of Switzerland (not citizens) and had a different mother language than the classroom language.

As of 2000, there were a total of 58 students attending any school in the municipality. Of those, 20 both lived and attended school in the municipality, while 38 students came from another municipality. During the same year, 47 residents attended schools outside the municipality.
