= Schwadernau =

- Municipality
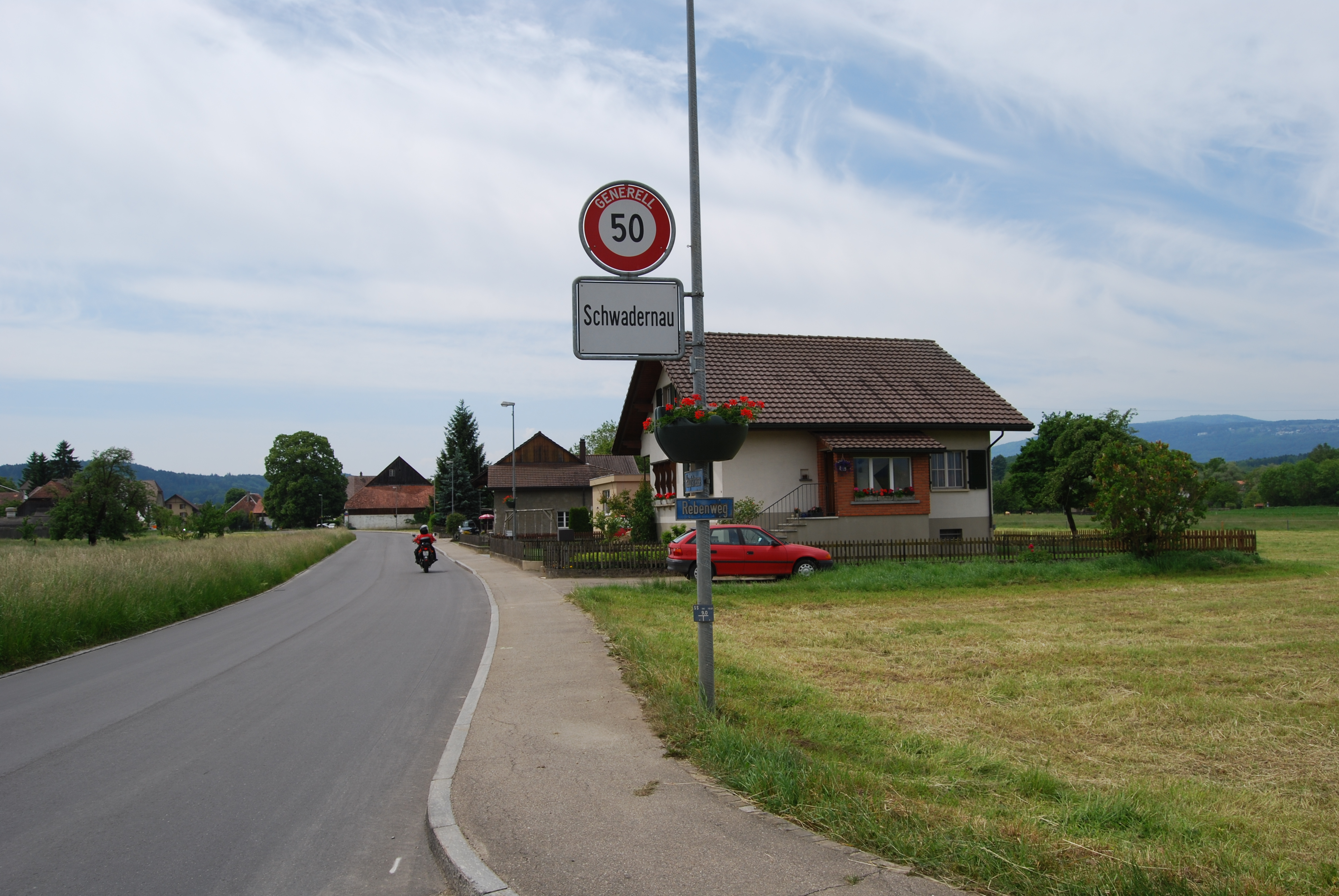

- Flag Coat of arms
- Location of Schwadernau
- Location within Switzerland Location within Canton of Bern
- Coordinates: 47°8′N 7°18′E
- Country: Switzerland
- Canton: Bern
- District: Biel/Bienne

Government
  - Executive: Gemeinderat with 5 members
  - Mayor: Gemeindepräsident; Daniela Schneider (as of 2026)

Area
  - Total: 4.1 km^{2} (1.6 sq mi)
- Elevation: 437 m (1,434 ft)

Population (December 2020)
  - Total: 692
  - Density: 170/km^{2} (440/sq mi)
- Time zone: UTC+01:00 (CET)
  - Summer (DST): UTC+02:00 (CEST)
- Postal code: 2556
- SFOS number: 748
- ISO 3166 code: CH-BE
- Surrounded by: Aegerten, Brügg, Büetigen, Dotzigen, Orpund, Scheuren, Studen
- Website: https://www.schwadernau.ch/

Schwadernau is a municipality in the Biel/Bienne administrative district in the canton of Bern in Switzerland.

== History ==
Schwadernau is first mentioned in 1269 as Swadernouwa.

A number of artifacts indicate that the area around Schwadernau has been inhabited since the Upper Paleolithic. In addition to Neolithic finds, many Bronze Age, Roman era and early medieval objects indicate that there were other prehistoric settlements near the modern municipality. A depot of iron ingots and the remains of a Roman wall show that there may have been a workshop or small settlement near the Räbhubel or Scheurenhubel. During the Middle Ages, the village was owned by the Counts of Neuchâtel-Nidau. In 1281, the Count gave about half of the village to the Prince-Bishop of Basel. In 1376, the Counts of Kyburg and Thierstein fought and defeated the Bishop of Basel outside Schwadernau. In 1398, the entire Inselgau region, including Schwadernau, was acquired by the city of Bern. Under Bernese rule, the village became part of the bailiwick of Nidau and the parish of Bürglen.

The Jura water correction projects and the construction of the Nidau-Büren Canal between 1868 and 1875 drained the marshes around the village, prevented flooding and opened up rich farmland. Today, almost one-fourth of the jobs in the village are in agriculture.

== Geography ==
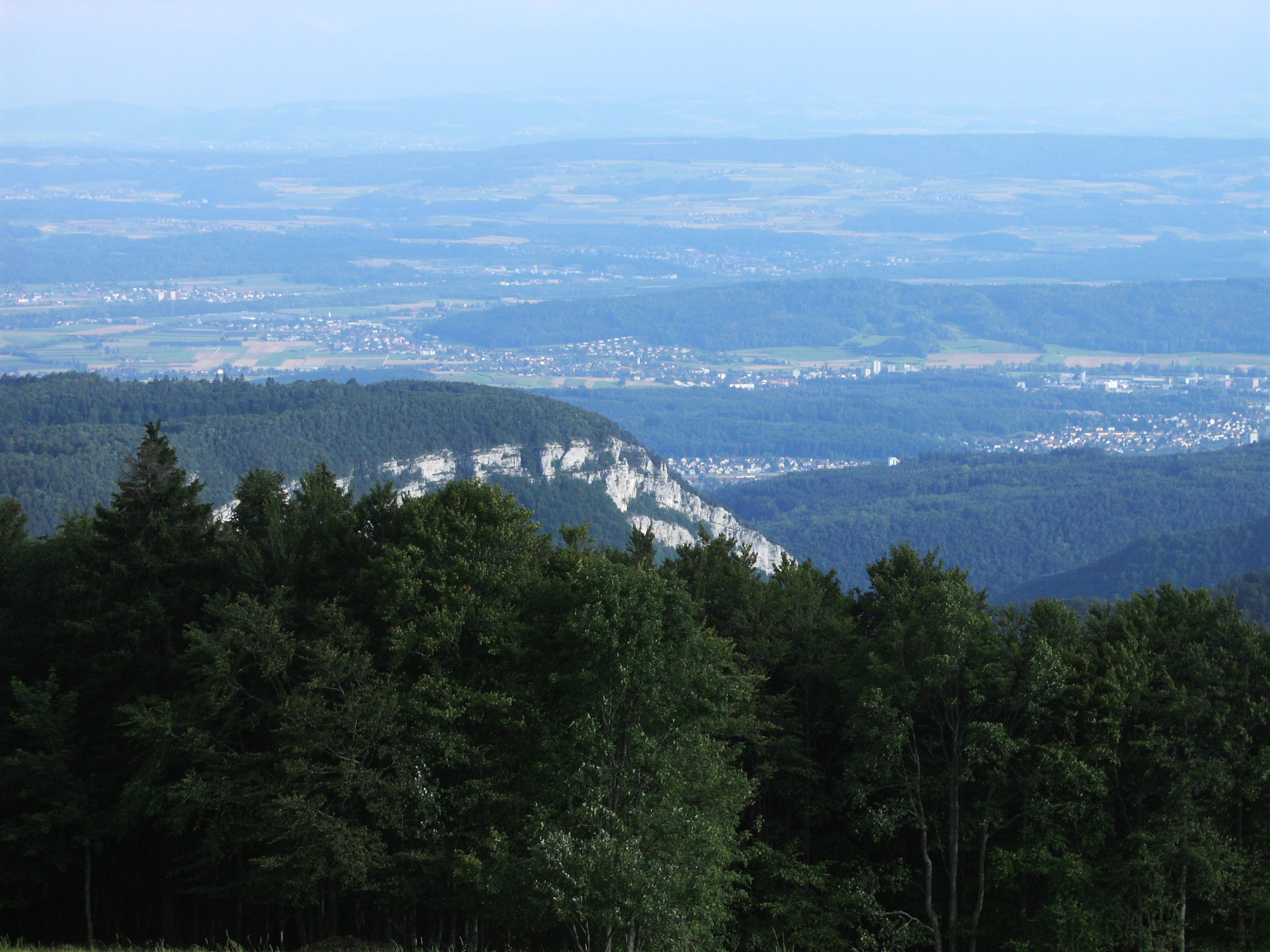
View from the Jura Mountains across the valley with Schwadernau in the distance

Schwadernau has an area of 4.15 km^{2} (1.60 sq mi). As of 2012, a total of 3.06 km^{2} (1.18 mi^{2}) or 73.9% is used for agricultural purposes, while 0.6 km^{2} (0.23 mi^{2}) or 14.5% is forested. The rest of the municipality is 0.42 km^{2} (0.16 mi^{2}) or 10.1% is settled (buildings or roads), 0.04 km^{2} (9.9 acres) or 1.0% is either rivers or lakes.

During the same year, housing and buildings made up 5.6% and transportation infrastructure made up 3.6%. A total of 13.3% of the total land area is heavily forested and 1.2% is covered with orchards or small clusters of trees. Of the agricultural land, 63.5% is used for growing crops and 7.5% is pasturage, while 2.9% is used for orchards or vine crops. All the water in the municipality is flowing water.

The municipality is located between the Nidau-Büren Canal and the old course of the Aare river.

On 31 December 2009, Amtsbezirk Nidau, the municipality's former district, was dissolved. On the following day, 1 January 2010, it joined the newly created Verwaltungskreis Biel/Bienne.

== Coat of arms ==
The blazon of the municipal coat of arms is Gules two Tournament Lances Argent in saltire and a Mullet of the same in chief.

== Demographics ==
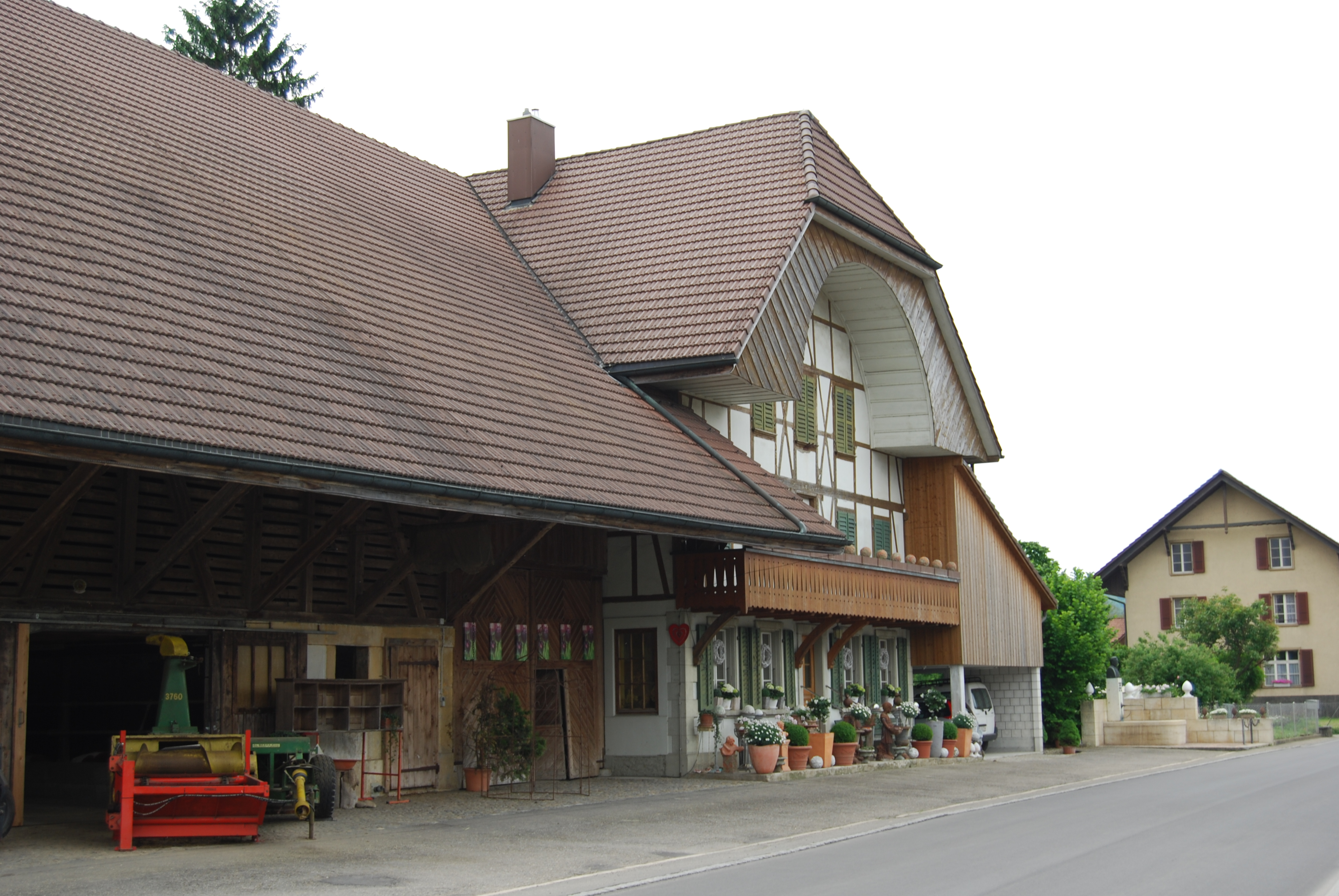
Barn and half-timbered farm house in Schwadernau

Schwadernau has a population (as of December 2020) of 692. As of 2010, 6.8% of the population are resident foreign nationals. Over the last 10 years (2001–2011) the population has changed at a rate of −1.2%. Migration accounted for −0.8%, while births and deaths accounted for −0.2%.

Most of the population (as of 2000) speaks German (614 or 91.8%) as their first language, French is the second most common (17 or 2.5%) and Serbo-Croatian is the third (8 or 1.2%). There are 4 people who speak Italian.

As of 2008, the population was 49.5% male and 50.5% female. The population was made up of 299 Swiss men (45.5% of the population) and 26 (4.0%) non-Swiss men. There were 313 Swiss women (47.6%) and 1 (0.2%) non-Swiss women. Of the population in the municipality, 160 or about 23.9% were born in Schwadernau and lived there in 2000. There were 308 or 46.0% who were born in the same canton, while 119 or 17.8% were born somewhere else in Switzerland, and 75 or 11.2% were born outside of Switzerland.

As of 2011, children and teenagers (0–19 years old) make up 22.3% of the population, while adults (20–64 years old) make up 59.3% and seniors (over 64 years old) make up 18.3%.

As of 2000, there were 254 people who were single and never married in the municipality. There were 360 married individuals, 26 widows or widowers and 29 individuals who are divorced.

As of 2010, there were 76 households that consist of only one person and 17 households with five or more people. In 2000, a total of 253 apartments (92.7% of the total) were permanently occupied, while 11 apartments (4.0%) were seasonally occupied and 9 apartments (3.3%) were empty. As of 2010, the construction rate of new housing units was 12.2 new units per 1000 residents. The vacancy rate for the municipality, in 2012, was 1.95%. In 2011, single family homes made up 64.7% of the total housing in the municipality.

The historical population is given in the following chart:

== Politics ==
In the 2011 federal election the most popular party was the Swiss People's Party (SVP) which received 41% of the vote. The next three most popular parties were the Conservative Democratic Party (BDP) (18.2%), the Social Democratic Party (SP) (11.6%) and the Evangelical People's Party (EVP) (8.2%). In the federal election, a total of 216 votes were cast, and the voter turnout was 44.4%.

== Economy ==
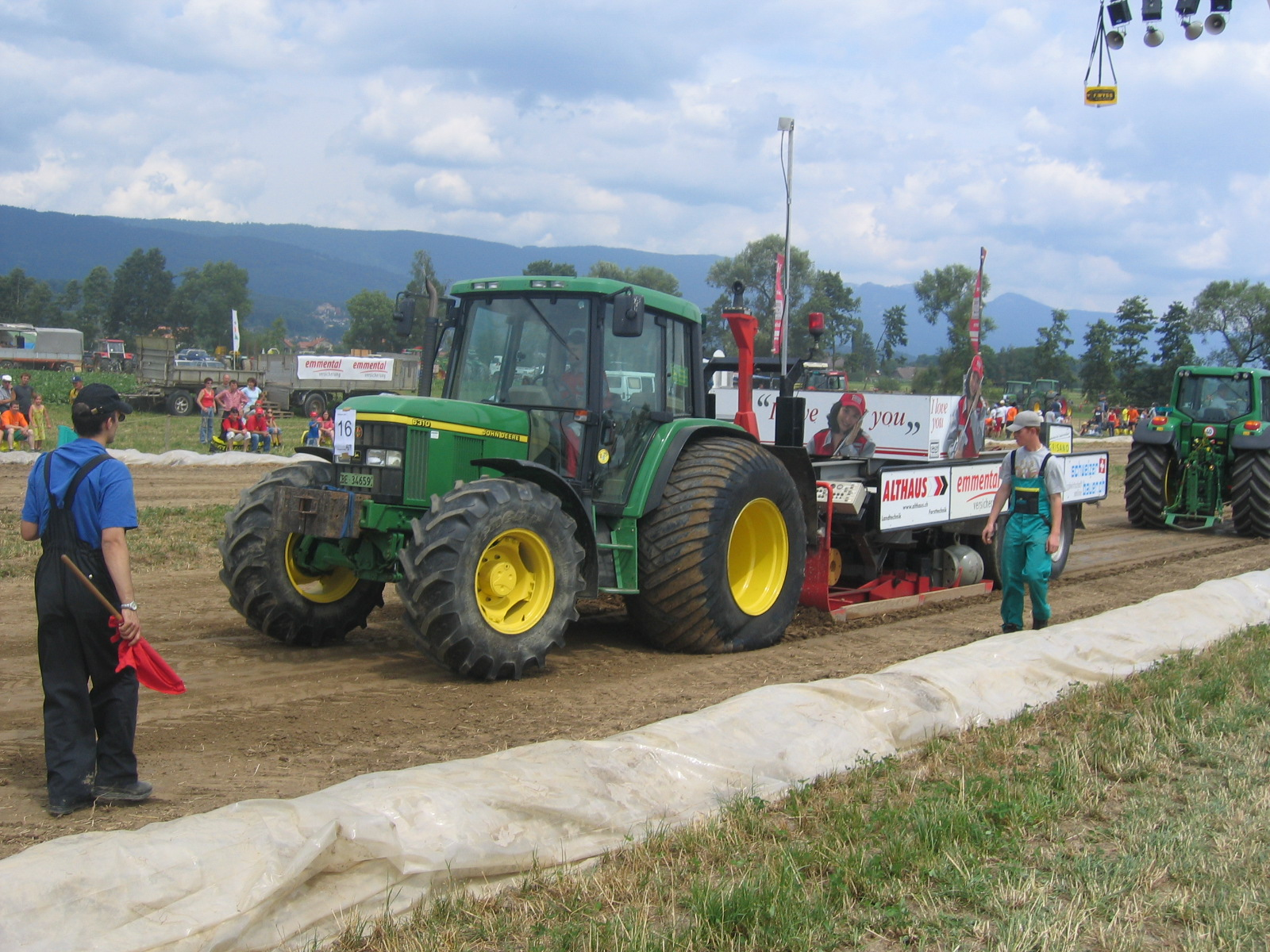
A tractor pull competition in Schwadernau in 2005. Much of the population is still employed in agriculture.

As of 2011, Schwadernau had an unemployment rate of 1.17%. As of 2008, there were a total of 162 people employed in the municipality. Of these, there were 60 people employed in the primary economic sector and about 18 businesses involved in this sector. 21 people were employed in the secondary sector and there were 6 businesses in this sector. 81 people were employed in the tertiary sector, with 13 businesses in this sector. There were 350 residents of the municipality who were employed in some capacity, of which females made up 43.1% of the workforce.

In 2008 there were a total of 116 full-time equivalent jobs. The number of jobs in the primary sector was 39, of which 34 were in agriculture and 6 were in forestry or lumber production. The number of jobs in the secondary sector was 19 of which 12 or (63.2%) were in manufacturing and 7 (36.8%) were in construction. The number of jobs in the tertiary sector was 58. In the tertiary sector; 31 or 53.4% were in wholesale or retail sales or the repair of motor vehicles, 1 was in the movement and storage of goods, 5 or 8.6% were in a hotel or restaurant, 3 or 5.2% were technical professionals or scientists, 6 or 10.3% were in education.

In 2000, there were 146 workers who commuted into the municipality and 278 workers who commuted away. The municipality is a net exporter of workers, with about 1.9 workers leaving the municipality for every one entering. A total of 72 workers (33.0% of the 218 total workers in the municipality) both lived and worked in Schwadernau. Of the working population, 12.6% used public transportation to get to work, and 61.7% used a private car.

In 2011 the average local and cantonal tax rate on a married resident, with two children, of Schwadernau making 150,000 CHF was 12.5%, while an unmarried resident's rate was 18.4%. For comparison, the average rate for the entire canton in the same year, was 14.2% and 22.0%, while the nationwide average was 12.3% and 21.1% respectively. In 2009 there were a total of 281 tax payers in the municipality. Of that total, 97 made over 75,000 CHF per year. There were 2 people who made between 15,000 and 20,000 per year. The average income of the over 75,000 CHF group in Schwadernau was 113,955 CHF, while the average across all of Switzerland was 130,478 CHF.

In 2011 a total of 0.5% of the population received direct financial assistance from the government.

== Religion ==
From the 2000 census, 446 or 66.7% belonged to the Swiss Reformed Church, while 86 or 12.9% were Roman Catholic. Of the rest of the population, there were 9 members of an Orthodox church (or about 1.35% of the population), there were 2 individuals (or about 0.30% of the population) who belonged to the Christian Catholic Church, and there were 32 individuals (or about 4.78% of the population) who belonged to another Christian church. There were 19 (or about 2.84% of the population) who were Islamic. There was 1 person who was Buddhist. 67 (or about 10.01% of the population) belonged to no church, are agnostic or atheist, and 7 individuals (or about 1.05% of the population) did not answer the question.

== Education ==
In Schwadernau about 60.6% of the population have completed non-mandatory upper secondary education, and 17.2% have completed additional higher education (either university or a Fachhochschule). Of the 74 who had completed some form of tertiary schooling listed in the census, 77.0% were Swiss men, 14.9% were Swiss women, 6.8% were non-Swiss men.

The Canton of Bern school system provides one year of non-obligatory Kindergarten, followed by six years of Primary school. This is followed by three years of obligatory lower Secondary school where the students are separated according to ability and aptitude. Following the lower Secondary students may attend additional schooling or they may enter an apprenticeship.

During the 2011–12 school year, there were a total of 61 students attending classes in Schwadernau. There was one kindergarten class with a total of 20 students in the municipality. The municipality had 2 primary classes and 41 students. Of the primary students, 2.4% were permanent or temporary residents of Switzerland (not citizens) and 4.9% have a different mother language than the classroom language.

As of 2000, there were a total of 52 students attending any school in the municipality. Of those, 33 both lived and attended school in the municipality, while 19 students came from another municipality. During the same year, 68 residents attended schools outside the municipality.
