= Brügg, Bern =

Brügg
- Municipality
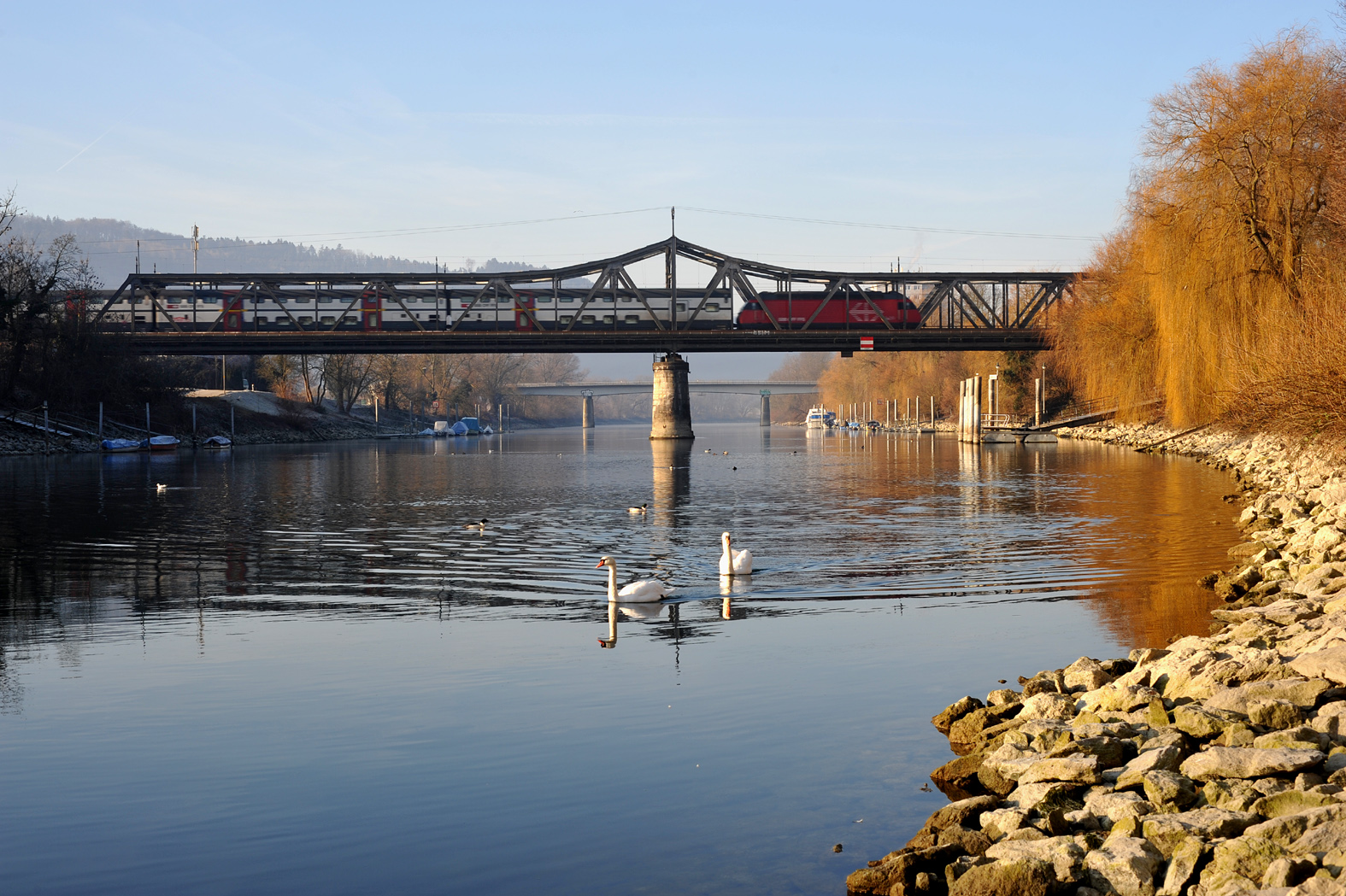
- Railroad bridge between Brügg and Aegerten

- Flag Coat of arms
- Location of Brügg
- Location within Switzerland Location within Canton of Bern
- Coordinates: 47°7′N 7°17′E
- Country: Switzerland
- Canton: Bern
- District: Biel/Bienne

Government
  - Executive: Gemeinderat with 7 members
  - Mayor: Gemeindepräsident; Franz Kölliker OV (as of 2026)

Area
  - Total: 5.0 km^{2} (1.9 sq mi)
- Elevation: 485 m (1,591 ft)

Population (Dec 2020)
  - Total: 4,371
  - Density: 870/km^{2} (2,300/sq mi)
- Time zone: UTC+01:00 (CET)
  - Summer (DST): UTC+02:00 (CEST)
- Postal code: 2555
- SFOS number: 733
- ISO 3166 code: CH-BE
- Surrounded by: Aegerten, Biel/Bienne, Orpund, Port, Schwadernau
- Website: www.bruegg.ch

Brügg is a municipality in the Biel/Bienne administrative district in the canton of Bern in Switzerland.

== History ==
Brügg is first mentioned in 1261 as Brugge. A Hallstatt culture tumulus near the city indicates that his area was settled anciently. During the Late Roman Empire era it gained importance as a bridge on the Roman road from Petinesca over the Mett in the Jura Mountains. The Zihl River was built in 368-369 and its ruins are still is visible on an island in the river and below the church in Bürglen (now part of Aegerten).

In the Late Middle Ages, Brügg belonged to the Grafschaft (county) of Nidau. Along with the rest of the county, Brügg was partly incorporated into Bernese territory in 1388 with the remaining rights coming to Bern in 1393. As part of the Bernese county of Nidau, Brügg, Aegerten and the village of Bürglen were known as the Brüggviertel (Brügg Quarter). The main land owners in Brügg were the House of Kyburg and Gottstatt Abbey. During the Middle Ages the Roman bridge was replaced with a ferry. Despite being separated from Bürglen by the Zihl river, Brügg was part of the parish of Bürglen and was closely tied to the communities across the river. The communities shared a school until a school opened in Brügg in 1683. Brügg had its own cemetery beginning in 1900 and became an independent parish in 1971. From the collapse of the Roman bridge until 1832, the only way across the river was a ferry.

As Biel became a regional industrial center, Brügg became a suburb and commuter town. The construction of a railroad in 1865 and a highway in 1955 connected Brügg into the Bern-Lyss-Biel route and encouraged the village to grow into an industrial town. Beginning in 1950, the population of Brügg exploded. It grew by 68% between 1950 and 1960, which was the fastest growth rate in the Canton. A number of new housing developments, including; Pfeid, Gummen, Brachmatt, Baltismatt, Burgersried, Winzenried and Neubrückquartier, grew up around Brügg to house the growing population.

== Geography ==
Brügg has an area of 5 km^{2} (1.93 sq mi). As of 2012, a total of 1.48 km^{2} (0.57 mi^{2}) or 29.7% is used for agricultural purposes, while 1.58 km^{2} (0.61 mi^{2}) or 31.7% is forested. Of the rest of the land, 1.72 km^{2} (0.66 mi^{2}) or 34.5% is settled (buildings or roads), 0.23 km^{2} (0.089 mi^{2}) or 4.6% is either rivers or lakes.

During the same year, industrial buildings made up 8.0% of the total area while housing and buildings made up 12.2% and transportation infrastructure made up 6.4%. Power and water infrastructure as well as other special developed areas made up 2.6% of the area while parks, green belts and sports fields made up 5.2%. Out of the forested land, all of the forested land area is covered with heavy forests. Of the agricultural land, 22.8% is used for growing crops and 5.6% is pastures, while 1.2% is used for orchards or vine crops. All the water in the municipality is flowing water.

It lies on the river Aare approximately 3 km (1.9 mi) from its outflow from Lake Biel. Brügg is located near Biel/Bienne on the left bank of the Nidau-Büren channel. The old city is surrounded with new industrial and housing developments.

On 31 December 2009 Amtsbezirk Nidau, the municipality's former district, was dissolved. On the following day, 1 January 2010, it joined the newly created Verwaltungskreis Biel/Bienne.

== Coat of arms ==
The blazon of the municipal coat of arms is Argent a Bridge Sable and in base three Bends Wavy adjoined. The bridge (German: Brücke) refers to the Roman and later bridges over the Zihl river and with a Swiss German pronunciation becomes an example of canting arms.

== Demographics ==
Brügg has a population (as of December 2020) of 4,371. As of 2010, 19.0% of the population are resident foreign nationals. Over the last 10 years (2001-2011) the population has changed at a rate of 1.8%. Migration accounted for 1.7%, while births and deaths accounted for 0.2%.

Most of the population (as of 2000) speaks German (3,323 or 82.8%) as their first language, French is the second most common (293 or 7.3%) and Italian is the third (115 or 2.9%).

As of 2008, the population was 48.4% male and 51.6% female. The population was made up of 1,591 Swiss men (38.3% of the population) and 420 (10.1%) non-Swiss men. There were 1,776 Swiss women (42.7%) and 36 (0.9%) non-Swiss women. Of the population in the municipality, 838 or about 20.9% were born in Brügg and lived there in 2000. There were 1,653 or 41.2% who were born in the same canton, while 652 or 16.3% were born somewhere else in Switzerland, and 659 or 16.4% were born outside of Switzerland.

As of 2011, children and teenagers (0–19 years old) make up 19.8% of the population, while adults (20–64 years old) make up 61.1% and seniors (over 64 years old) make up 19.1%.

As of 2000, there were 1,538 people who were single and never married in the municipality. There were 1,947 married individuals, 253 widows or widowers and 273 individuals who are divorced.

As of 2010, there were 761 households that consist of only one person and 80 households with five or more people. In 2000, a total of 1,814 apartments (91.4% of the total) were permanently occupied, while 83 apartments (4.2%) were seasonally occupied and 87 apartments (4.4%) were empty. As of 2010, the construction rate of new housing units was 5.8 new units per 1000 residents. The vacancy rate for the municipality, in 2012, was 3.3%. In 2011, single family homes made up 51.8% of the total housing in the municipality.

The historical population is given in the following chart:

== Politics ==
In the 2011 federal election the most popular party was the Swiss People's Party (SVP) which received 29.3% of the vote. The next three most popular parties were the Social Democratic Party (SP) (21.9%), the Conservative Democratic Party (BDP) (15.1%) and the FDP.The Liberals (8.7%). In the federal election, a total of 1,094 votes were cast, and the voter turnout was 38.3%.

== Economy ==
As of 2011, Brügg had an unemployment rate of 3.1%. As of 2008, there were a total of 3,292 people employed in the municipality. Of these, there were 24 people employed in the primary economic sector and about 8 businesses involved in this sector. 1,691 people were employed in the secondary sector and there were 65 businesses in this sector. 1,577 people were employed in the tertiary sector, with 176 businesses in this sector. There were 2,159 residents of the municipality who were employed in some capacity, of which females made up 43.9% of the workforce.

In 2008 there were a total of 2,911 full-time equivalent jobs. The number of jobs in the primary sector was 18, of which 13 were in agriculture and 5 were in forestry or lumber production. The number of jobs in the secondary sector was 1,591 of which 1,444 or (90.8%) were in manufacturing and 91 (5.7%) were in construction. The number of jobs in the tertiary sector was 1,302. In the tertiary sector; 755 or 58.0% were in wholesale or retail sales or the repair of motor vehicles, 62 or 4.8% were in the movement and storage of goods, 47 or 3.6% were in a hotel or restaurant, 20 or 1.5% were in the information industry, 14 or 1.1% were the insurance or financial industry, 120 or 9.2% were technical professionals or scientists, 65 or 5.0% were in education and 99 or 7.6% were in health care.

In 2000, there were 2,894 workers who commuted into the municipality and 1,577 workers who commuted away. The municipality is a net importer of workers, with about 1.8 workers entering the municipality for every one leaving. A total of 582 workers (16.7% of the 3,476 total workers in the municipality) both lived and worked in Brügg. Of the working population, 21% used public transportation to get to work, and 54.4% used a private car.

In 2011 the average local and cantonal tax rate on a married resident, with two children, of Brügg making 150,000 CHF was 11.9%, while an unmarried resident's rate was 17.5%. For comparison, the rate for the entire canton in the same year, was 14.2% and 22.0%, while the nationwide rate was 12.3% and 21.1% respectively. In 2009 there were a total of 1,840 tax payers in the municipality. Of that total, 512 made over 75,000 CHF per year. There were 11 people who made between 15,000 and 20,000 per year. The greatest number of workers, 592, made between 50,000 and 75,000 CHF per year. The average income of the over 75,000 CHF group in Brügg was 109,074 CHF, while the average across all of Switzerland was 130,478 CHF.

In 2011 a total of 10.1% of the population received direct financial assistance from the government.

== Religion ==
From the 2000 census, 2,323 or 57.9% belonged to the Swiss Reformed Church, while 768 or 19.1% were Roman Catholic. Of the rest of the population, there were 53 members of an Orthodox church (or about 1.32% of the population), there were 10 individuals (or about 0.25% of the population) who belonged to the Christian Catholic Church, and there were 113 individuals (or about 2.82% of the population) who belonged to another Christian church. There were 140 (or about 3.49% of the population) who were Islamic. There were 26 individuals who were Buddhist, 70 individuals who were Hindu and 1 individual who belonged to another church. 331 (or about 8.25% of the population) belonged to no church, are agnostic or atheist, and 176 individuals (or about 4.39% of the population) did not answer the question.

== Education ==
In Brügg about 53.9% of the population have completed non-mandatory upper secondary education, and 15.8% have completed additional higher education (either university or a Fachhochschule). Of the 412 who had completed some form of tertiary schooling listed in the census, 66.7% were Swiss men, 22.6% were Swiss women, 6.8% were non-Swiss men and 3.9% were non-Swiss women.

The Canton of Bern school system provides one year of non-obligatory Kindergarten, followed by six years of Primary school. This is followed by three years of obligatory lower Secondary school where the students are separated according to ability and aptitude. Following the lower Secondary students may attend additional schooling or they may enter an apprenticeship.

During the 2011-12 school year, there were a total of 390 students attending classes in Brügg. There were 4 kindergarten classes with a total of 72 students in the municipality. Of the kindergarten students, 27.8% were permanent or temporary residents of Switzerland (not citizens) and 44.4% have a different mother language than the classroom language. The municipality had 13 primary classes and 218 students. Of the primary students, 28.0% were permanent or temporary residents of Switzerland (not citizens) and 38.1% have a different mother language than the classroom language. During the same year, there were 6 lower secondary classes with a total of 100 students. There were 17.0% who were permanent or temporary residents of Switzerland (not citizens) and 36.0% have a different mother language than the classroom language.

As of 2000, there were a total of 367 students attending any school in the municipality. Of those, 345 both lived and attended school in the municipality, while 22 students came from another municipality. During the same year, 140 residents attended schools outside the municipality.
