= Meienried =

- Municipality
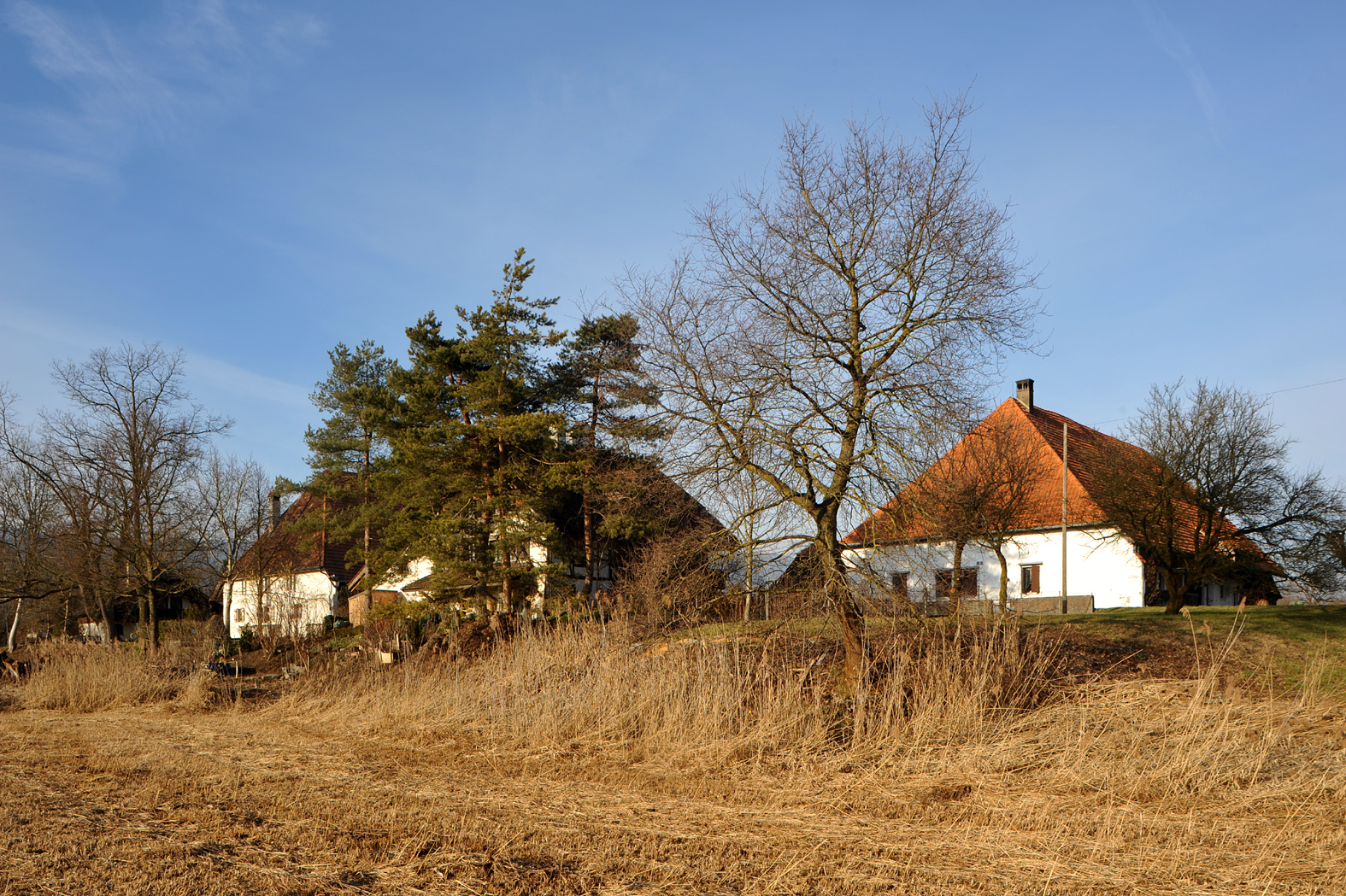
- Group of houses in Underfar (Meienried), view from the old course of the Zihl river

- Flag Coat of arms
- Location of Meienried
- Location within Switzerland Location within Canton of Bern
- Coordinates: 47°8′N 7°20′E
- Country: Switzerland
- Canton: Bern
- District: Seeland

Area
  - Total: 0.70 km^{2} (0.27 sq mi)
- Elevation: 430 m (1,410 ft)

Population (December 2020)
  - Total: 53
  - Density: 76/km^{2} (200/sq mi)
- Time zone: UTC+01:00 (CET)
  - Summer (DST): UTC+02:00 (CEST)
- Postal code: 3294
- SFOS number: 389
- ISO 3166 code: CH-BE
- Surrounded by: Büren an der Aare, Dotzigen, Safnern, Scheuren
- Website: https://meienried.ch/ SFSO statistics

Meienried is a municipality in the Seeland administrative district in the canton of Bern in Switzerland.

== History ==
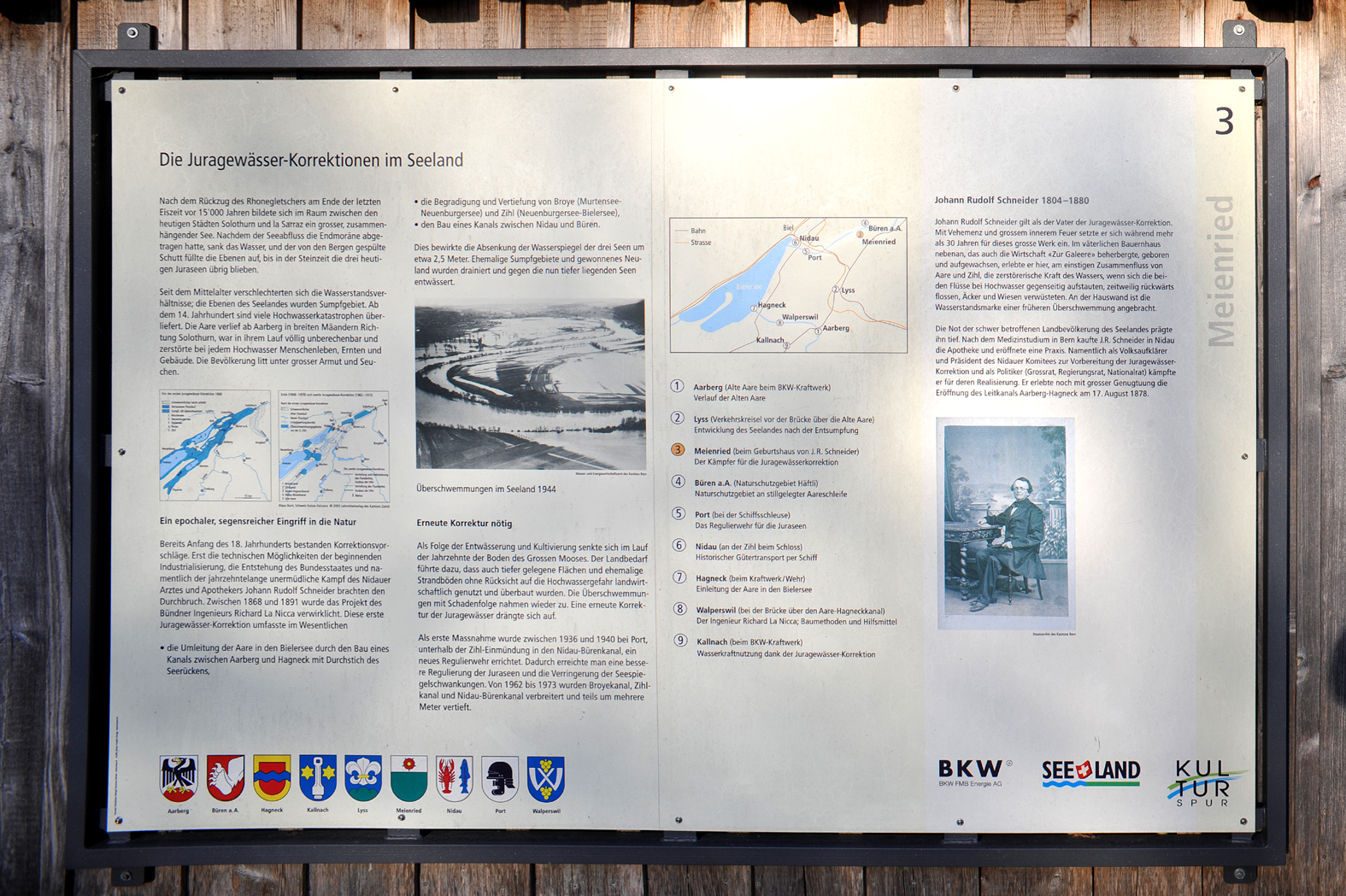
Information board about the Jura water corrections in Underfar (Meienried)

Meienried is first mentioned in 1255 as Meinrieth.

The village grew around a medieval ferry dock and customs station, which was first mentioned in 1268. It was located on a small rise between the Zihl and Aare rivers. On the eastern or Zihl side was Underfar village with a boat landing and a ferry to Safnern. On the western or Aare side was Oberfar with ferries to Dotzigen and Büren an der Aare. The village was part of the Büren district in the lands of the Counts of Neuchâtel-Nidau. In 1255, the Counts gave Meienried to the Gottstatt Monastery, which they had recently founded. After the extinction of the Counts, between 1388 and 1393 the entire Herrschaft of Büren, including Meienried, went to Bern.

The Jura water correction of 1868-75 helped protect the village from flooding from the surrounding rivers. In 1970 the marshes around the village were drained, which opened up additional farmland. In 1934 the Meienried Nature Preserve was established to help protect the old Zihl water course and the Meienriedloch. In 2003 the Tümpel bei Alter Aare was designated as part of the Federal Inventory of Amphibian Spawning Areas.

This small village has its own town hall and school district, but most of the residents commute to jobs in Büren or even Bern.

== Geography ==
Meienried has an area of 0.65 km^{2} (0.25 sq mi). Of this area, 0.47 km^{2} (0.18 mi^{2}) or 71.2% is used for agricultural purposes, while 0.11 km^{2} (0.042 mi^{2}) or 16.7% is forested. Of the rest of the land, 0.02 km^{2} (4.9 acres) or 3.0% is settled (buildings or roads), 0.04 km^{2} (9.9 acres) or 6.1% is either rivers or lakes and 0.03 km^{2} (7.4 acres) or 4.5% is unproductive land.

Of the built up area, housing and buildings made up 1.5% and transportation infrastructure made up 1.5%. Out of the forested land, 13.6% of the total land area is heavily forested and 3.0% is covered with orchards or small clusters of trees. Of the agricultural land, 56.1% is used for growing crops and 13.6% is pastures, while 1.5% is used for orchards or vine crops. Of the water in the municipality, 4.5% is in lakes and 1.5% is in rivers and streams.

The municipality is located at the confluence of the Zihl and Aare rivers.

On 31 December 2009 Amtsbezirk Büren, the municipality's former district, was dissolved. On the following day, 1 January 2010, it joined the newly created Verwaltungskreis Seeland.

== Coat of arms ==
The blazon of the municipal coat of arms is Vert on a Chief Argent a Rose Gules barbed of the first and seeded Or.

== Demographics ==
Meienried has a population (as of December 2020) of 53. As of 2010, 1.9% of the population are resident foreign nationals. Over the last 10 years (2000–2010) the population has changed at a rate of -14.3%. Migration accounted for -9.5%, while births and deaths accounted for -4.8%.

Most of the population (as of 2000) speaks German (55 or 93.2%) as their first language, French is the second most common (3 or 5.1%) and Czech is the third (1 or 1.7%).

As of 2008, the population was 52.8% male and 47.2% female. The population was made up of 28 Swiss men (52.8% of the population), 24 Swiss women (45.3%) and 1 (1.9%) non-Swiss women.

Of the population in the municipality, 21 or about 35.6% were born in Meienried and lived there in 2000. There were 18 or 30.5% who were born in the same canton, while 14 or 23.7% were born somewhere else in Switzerland, and 2 or 3.4% were born outside of Switzerland.

As of 2010, children and teenagers (0–19 years old) make up 5.7% of the population, while adults (20–64 years old) make up 81.1% and seniors (over 64 years old) make up 13.2%. As of 2000, there were 29 people who were single and never married in the municipality. There were 24 married individuals, 3 widows or widowers and 3 individuals who are divorced.

As of 2000, there were 8 households that consist of only one person and 2 households with five or more people. In 2000, a total of 19 apartments (82.6% of the total) were permanently occupied, while 4 apartments (17.4%) were seasonally occupied. The vacancy rate for the municipality, in 2011, was 8.33%.

The historical population is given in the following chart:

== Sights ==
The entire Meienried area is designated as part of the Inventory of Swiss Heritage Sites.

== Economy ==
As of 2011, Meienried had an unemployment rate of 2.93%. As of 2008, there were a total of 22 people employed in the municipality. Of these, there were 13 people employed in the primary economic sector and about 5 businesses involved in this sector. No one was employed in the secondary sector. 9 people were employed in the tertiary sector, with 1 business in this sector.

In 2008 there were a total of 16 full-time equivalent jobs. There were 8 jobs in agriculture and 8 jobs in the tertiary sector, in a hotel or restaurant.

In 2000, there were 25 workers who commuted away from the municipality. Of the working population, 13.9% used public transportation to get to work, and 63.9% used a private car.

== Religion ==
From the 2000 census, 3 or 5.1% were Roman Catholic, while 47 or 79.7% belonged to the Swiss Reformed Church. 6 (or about 10.17% of the population) belonged to no church, are agnostic or atheist, and 3 individuals (or about 5.08% of the population) did not answer the question.

== Education ==
In Meienried about 21 or (35.6%) of the population have completed non-mandatory upper secondary education, and 7 or (11.9%) have completed additional higher education (either university or a Fachhochschule). Of the 7 who completed tertiary schooling, 85.7% were Swiss men, 14.3% were Swiss women. During the 2010–11 school year, there were no students attending school in Meienried.

As of 2000, there were 12 students from Meienried who attended schools outside the municipality.
