= Biel/Bienne (administrative district) =

Coordinates: 47°08′N 7°14′E

Biel/Bienne District Verwaltungskreis Biel/Bienne
- Administrative District
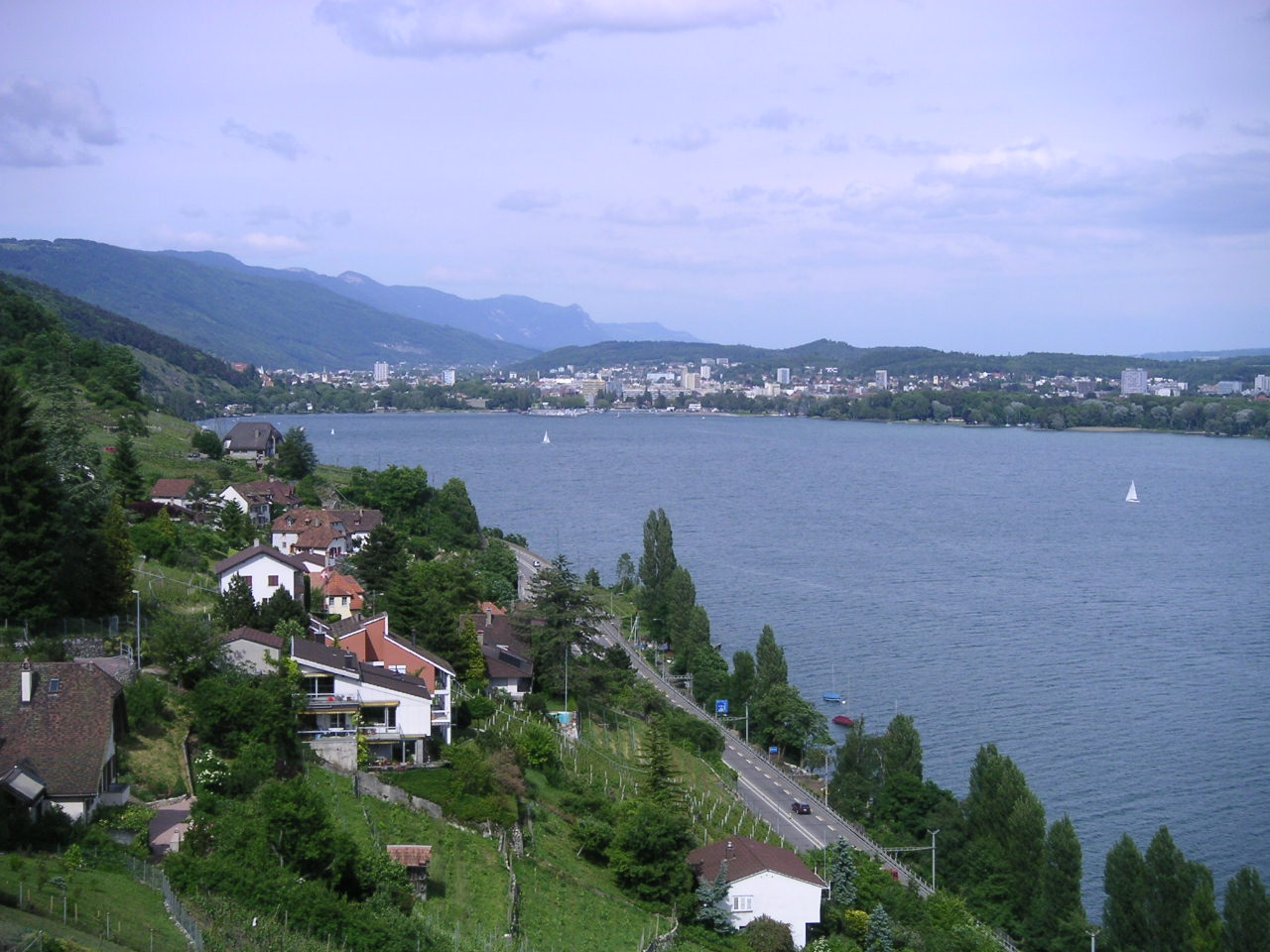
- The shores of northeastern Lake Biel in 2004
- Map depicting the boundary of the administrative district and its municipalities
- Country: Switzerland
- Canton: Bern
- Capital: Biel/Bienne

Area
  - Total: 97.63 km^{2} (37.70 sq mi)

Population (2020)
  - Total: 102,425
  - Density: 1,049/km^{2} (2,717/sq mi)
- Time zone: UTC+1 (CET)
  - Summer (DST): UTC+2 (CEST)
- Municipalities: 19

Biel/Bienne District is an administrative district in the Canton of Bern, Switzerland. It is located along both shores of the northeastern half of Lake Biel and is part of the Seeland administrative region, and its capital is Biel/Bienne. It contains 19 municipalities with an area of 97.63 km^{2} (37.70 sq mi) and a population (as of December 2008) of 90,536, over half of which lives in the district's capital. While it is the smallest district in surface area, it has the third largest population in the canton.

The present Biel/Bienne Verwaltungskreis ("administrative district") was created on 1 January 2010, consisting of the entirety of one former Amtsbezirke ("district"), Biel, about half of another, Nidau and three municipalities of Büren.

Flag	Name	Population (2020)	Area in km^{2}
Aegerten	Aegerten	2,210	2.16
Bellmund	Bellmund	1,723	3.82
Biel/Bienne	Biel/Bienne	55,206	21.21
Brügg	Brügg	4,371	5.02
Ipsach	Ipsach	3,913	1.91
Lengnau	Lengnau	5,316	7.37
Evilard/Leubringen	Evilard/Leubringen	2,672	3.69
Ligerz	Ligerz	545	1.79
Meinisberg	Meinisberg	1,326	4.43
Mörigen	Mörigen	875	2.16
Nidau	Nidau	6,943	1.52
Orpund	Orpund	3,052	4.16
Pieterlen	Pieterlen	4,784	8.31
Port	Port	3,801	2.45
Safnern	Safnern	1,951	5.61
Scheuren	Scheuren	475	1.99
Schwadernau	Schwadernau	692	4.02
Sutz-Lattrigen	Sutz-Lattrigen	1,399	3.58
Twann-Tüscherz	Twann-Tüscherz	1,171	12.43
	Total (19)	102,425	97.63
