= Nidau-Büren Canal =

Canal that drains the waters of the river Aare out of the Lake of Biel/Bienne

Coordinates: 47.139°N 7.325°E

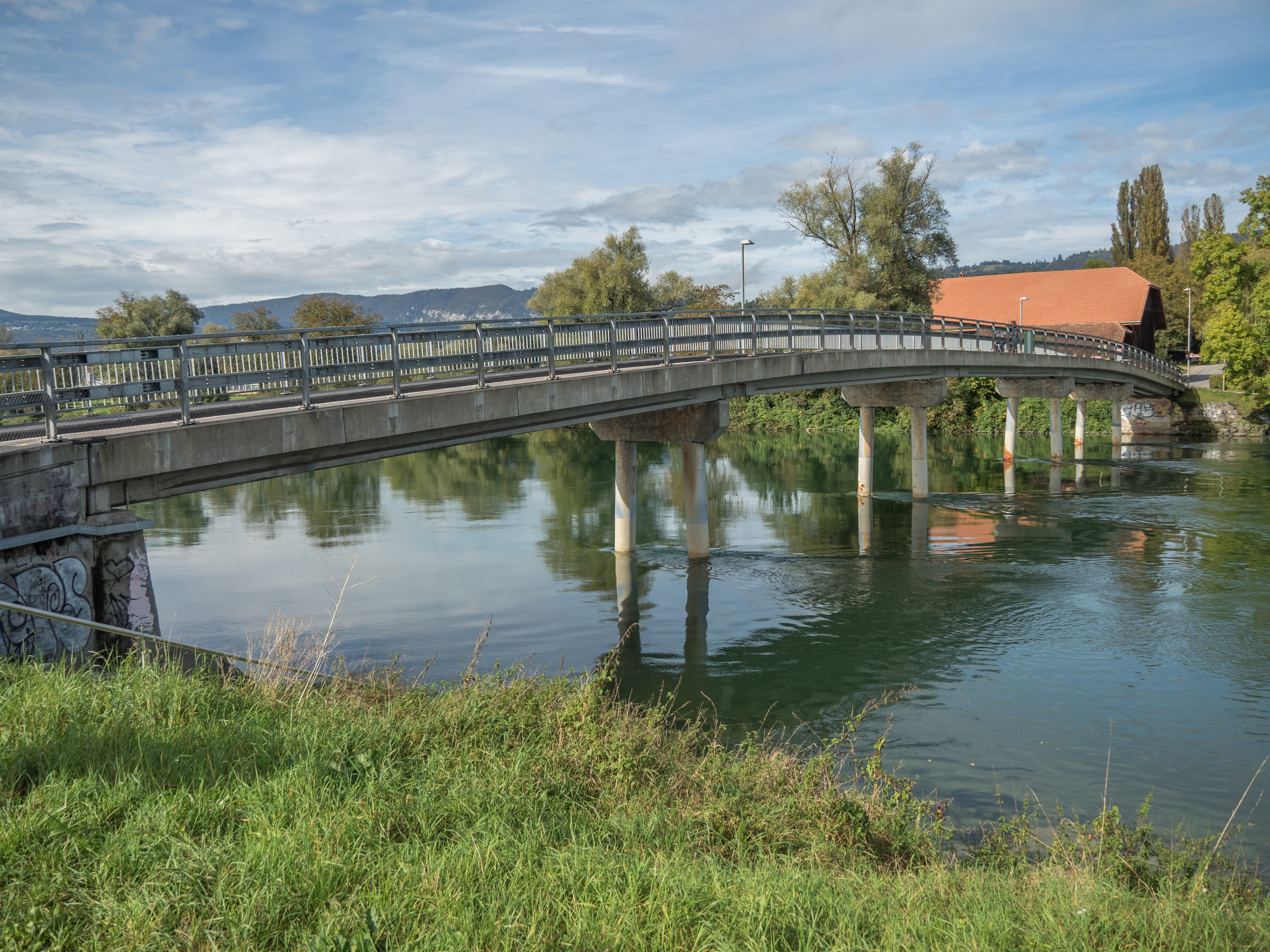
Gottstatt Bridge over the Nidau–Büren Canal between Orpund and Scheuren, canton of Bern (October 2024)

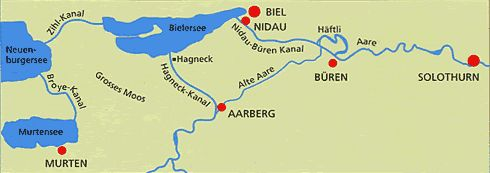
Map of the Nidau–Büren Canal and its surrounding area

The Nidau–Büren Canal (German: Nidau-Büren-Kanal, French: Canal de Nidau-Büren) is a 12-kilometre (7.5 mi) canal that carries the Aare River from Lake Biel (Bielersee) to Büren an der Aare. It was constructed between 1868 and 1891 as part of the First Jura water correction

== History ==
The Nidau–Büren Canal was constructed as part of the First Jura water correction (1868–1891), a project aimed at draining the marshy Seeland and stabilizing water levels in the three Jura lakes. Planned by the engineer Richard La Nicca, the scheme diverted the Aare through the newly dug Hagneck Canal into Lake Biel, straightened, canalised and deepened the Zihl and Broye, and created the Nidau–Büren Canal to return the river’s waters toward Büren an der Aare.

Work on the canal lasted more than two decades, cost around 5.8 million Swiss francs (about 370 million in 2020 values), and required extensive use of new machinery imported from France that had been developed during the construction of the Suez Canal.

At the canal’s outflow near Nidau, a simple weir was initially erected to regulate Lake Biel’s water level. This structure soon became insufficient and was replaced in 1887 by the so-called Nidauwehr. However, the new dam could not handle extreme flooding, most notably during the high waters of 1910.

The Port regulating dam was built between 1936 and 1939. The installation became the key control structure for the Jura lakes and also included a navigation lock for shipping on the Aare. The lock, measuring 52 m by 11.5 m, is used by both passenger vessels and private craft, and around 5,000 vessels pass through it each year.

During the Second Jura water correction (1962–1973), the canal was widened and deepened, while the Port dam was incorporated into a broader hydraulic system that also included the Aare downstream to the Flumenthal power station.

In 1995, the Brügg hydroelectric power station was added alongside the canal near the Port dam. The facility produces roughly 25 GWh of electricity annually.

== See also ==
- Hydropower in Switzerland
