= Thielle =

Tributary to the Aare

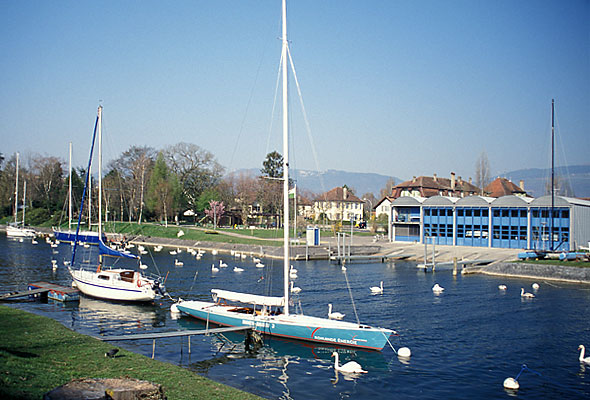

Location
- Country: Switzerland

Physical characteristics
- Mouth: Lake Biel
  - coordinates: 47.0507°N 7.0764°E

Basin features
- Progression: Lake Biel→ Aare→ Rhine→ North Sea

The river Thielle (French: Thielle or French: Thièle [tjɛl]; German: Zihl [tsiːl]) is a tributary to the Aare, in the Swiss Seeland.

The Thielle results from the merging of the Orbe and Talent, northeast of the little city of Orbe in the Swiss canton of Vaud. It flows as a channel northeastwards through an intensively cultivated plain called "Plaine de l'Orbe" and flows after only 9 km into the Lake of Neuchâtel at Yverdon-les-Bains.

The natural course of the river was considerably modified during the Jura water correction. Between the Lakes of Neuchâtel and Biel/Bienne it was converted into a dug-out channel. However, the previous natural bed of La Thielle still exists in some parts.

The river flows out of the lake in Biel/Bienne and after 2 km merges directly into the Nidau-Büren channel, which was also dug out during the Jura water correction, ensuring the outflow of the Aare, just before the regulating dam in Port which was commissioned in 1939. Before, La Thielle used to flow into the Aare 7 km further downstream in the vicinity of Büren an der Aare.

In the seventeenth century, a grand project was formed to establish a waterway transport system connecting the rivers Rhône and Rhine via the Lake of Geneva - the Venoge - and the Canal d’Entreroches - La Thielle - Aare. It remained unfinished.

A commercial waterway of this nature would have had a very significant impact on the European commercial transportation system.

== See also ==
- List of rivers of Switzerland
