= Nidau District =

Coordinates: 47.1167°N 7.23333°E

Nidau District Amtsbezirk Nidau
- District
- Flag Coat of arms

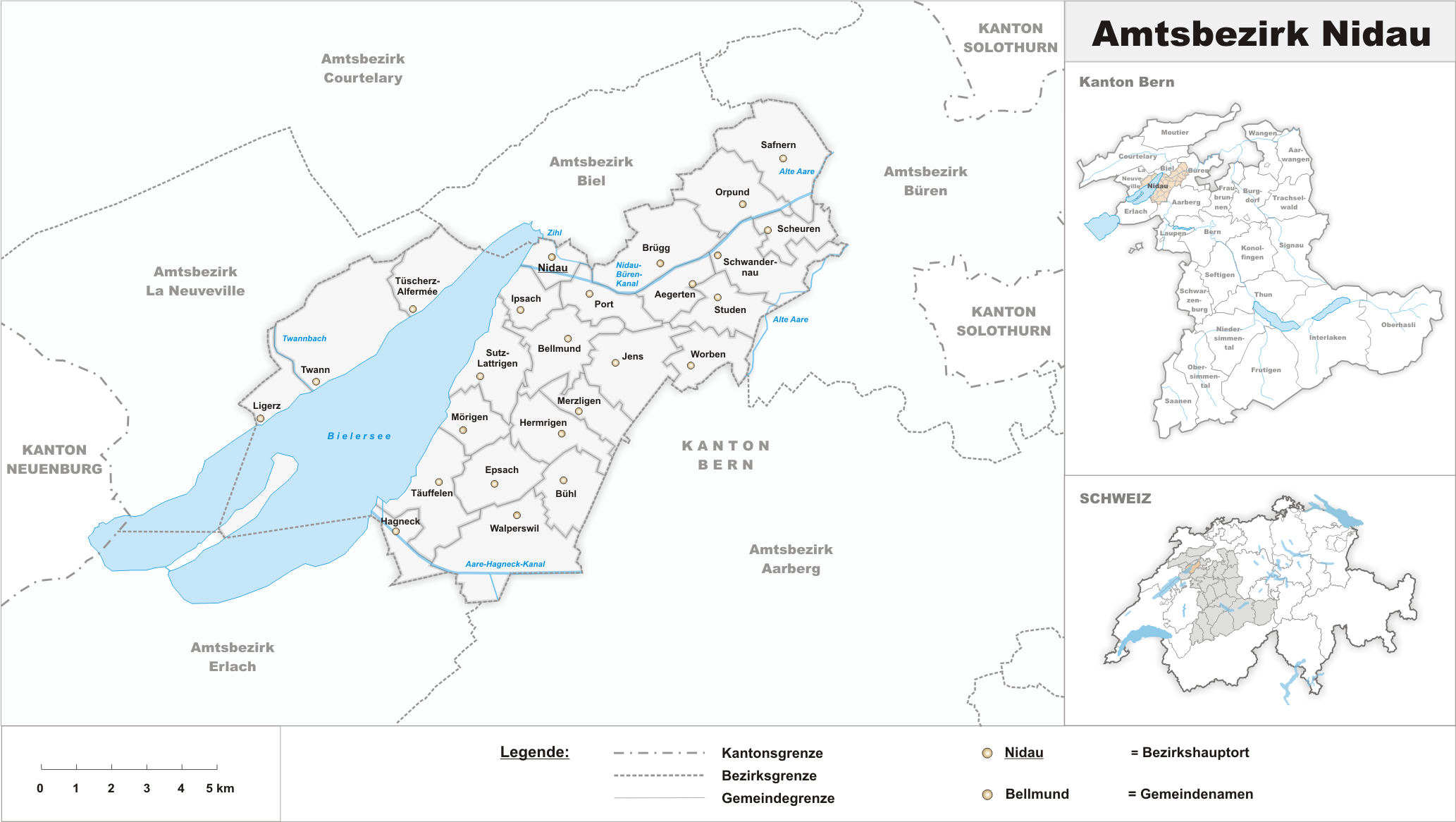
- Country: Switzerland
- Canton: Bern
- Capital: Nidau

Area
  - Total: 88 km^{2} (34 sq mi)

Population (2007)
  - Total: 40,728
  - Density: 460/km^{2} (1,200/sq mi)
- Time zone: UTC+1 (CET)
  - Summer (DST): UTC+2 (CEST)
- Municipalities: 25

Nidau District is one of the 26 administrative districts in the canton of Bern, Switzerland. Its capital, while having administrative power, was the municipality of Nidau.

From 1 January 2010, the district lost its administrative power while being replaced by the Biel/Bienne (administrative district), whose administrative centre is Biel/Bienne.

Since 2010, it remains therefore a fully recognised district under the law and the Constitution (Art.3 al.2) of the Canton of Berne.

Although the district is officially German speaking, a small French-speaking minority lives in the area. The district has an area of 113 km^{2} and consisted of 25 municipalities:

| Municipality | Population(Dec 2007) | Area (km^{2}) |
|---|---|---|
| Aegerten | 1,656 | 2.1 |
| Bellmund | 1,371 | 3.8 |
| Brügg | 3,962 | 5.0 |
| Bühl bei Aarberg | 421 | 3.0 |
| Epsach | 343 | 3.4 |
| Hagneck | 418 | 1.8 |
| Hermrigen | 264 | 3.5 |
| Ipsach | 3,747 | 1.9 |
| Jens | 648 | 4.6 |
| Ligerz | 507 | 1.8 |
| Merzligen | 404 | 2.3 |
| Mörigen | 841 | 2.2 |
| Nidau | 6,652 | 1.5 |
| Orpund | 2,620 | 4.0 |
| Port | 3,206 | 2.5 |
| Safnern | 1,839 | 5.6 |
| Scheuren | 452 | 2.1 |
| Schwadernau | 623 | 4.1 |
| Studen | 2,642 | 2.7 |
| Sutz-Lattrigen | 1,303 | 3.6 |
| Täuffelen | 2,523 | 4.4 |
| Tüscherz-Alfermée | 309 | 3.3 |
| Twann | 818 | 9.1 |
| Walperswil | 890 | 7.0 |
| Worben | 2,269 | 2.8 |
