= Merzligen =

- Municipality
- Flag Coat of arms
- Location of Merzligen
- Location within Switzerland Location within Canton of Bern
- Coordinates: 47°5′N 7°15′E
- Country: Switzerland
- Canton: Bern
- District: Seeland

Area
  - Total: 2.3 km^{2} (0.89 sq mi)
- Elevation: 509 m (1,670 ft)

Population (Dec 2011)
  - Total: 410
  - Density: 180/km^{2} (460/sq mi)
- Time zone: UTC+01:00 (CET)
  - Summer (DST): UTC+02:00 (CEST)
- Postal code: 3274
- SFOS number: 741
- ISO 3166 code: CH-BE
- Surrounded by: Bellmund, Hermrigen, Jens, Kappelen
- Twin towns: Jamné (Czech Republic)
- Website: www.merzligen.ch

Merzligen is a municipality in the Seeland administrative district in the canton of Bern in Switzerland.

== History ==
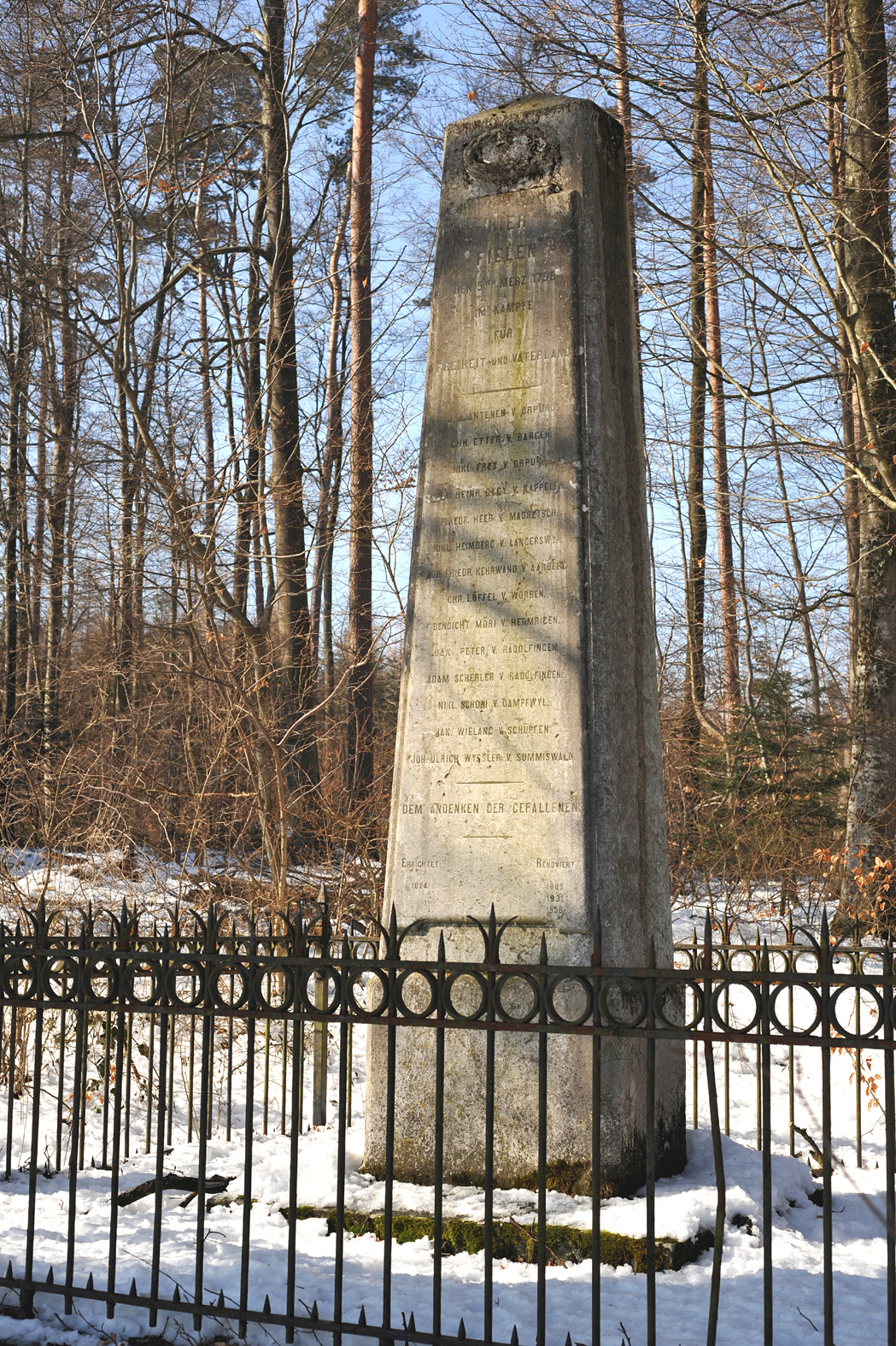
Battle of St. Niklaus memorial, near Merzligen

Merzligen is first mentioned in 1278 as Merzelingen.

The oldest trace of settlement in the area is the remains of a Roman road which was discovered near the Kühmatt section. By the Late Middle Ages a number of local nobles and monasteries owned land in the village. In 1398 it was acquired by the city of Bern and incorporated into the bailiwick of Nidau. The hamlet of St. Niklaus was named after a small chapel and hermitage. By 1480 the hermitage had grown into a small monastery. When Bern adopted the new faith of the Protestant Reformation in 1528, the monastery was closed. During the 1798 French invasion, on 5 March 1798, a small battle was fought outside St. Niklaus. The Swiss forces had 16 men killed in the battle, all of whom were buried there and a small memorial was erected. In 1824 the original monument was replaced with the current obelisk.

For most of its history, it was part of the parish of Bürglen. In 1674, the residents built their own church and unsuccessfully attempted to split away from the Bürglen parish. Other attempts in 1724, 1776 and 1932 was also unsuccessful. In 1947 it joined the parish of Worben.

== Geography ==
Merzligen has an area of 2.3 km^{2} (0.89 sq mi). As of 2012, a total of 1.63 km^{2} (0.63 mi^{2}) or 71.5% is used for agricultural purposes, while 0.38 km^{2} (0.15 mi^{2}) or 16.7% is forested. Of the rest of the land, 0.24 km^{2} (0.093 mi^{2}) or 10.5% is settled (buildings or roads) and 0.01 km^{2} (2.5 acres) or 0.4% is unproductive land.

During the same year, housing and buildings made up 6.6% and transportation infrastructure made up 3.5%. Out of the forested land, all of the forested land area is covered with heavy forests. Of the agricultural land, 61.8% is used for growing crops and 5.7% is pastures, while 3.9% is used for orchards or vine crops.

Merzligen is located on the heights between Lake Biel and the Bernese Seeland. It includes the village of Merzligen and part of the hamlet of St. Niklaus (the other part belongs to Bellmund).

On 31 December 2009 Amtsbezirk Nidau, the municipality's former district, was dissolved. On the following day, 1 January 2010, it joined the newly created Verwaltungskreis Seeland.

== Coat of arms ==
The blazon of the municipal coat of arms is Argent a Linden Tree Vert issuant from a Base of the same.

== Demographics ==
Merzligen has a population (as of December 2020) of 389. As of 2010, 5.9% of the population are resident foreign nationals. Over the last 10 years (2001-2011) the population has changed at a rate of 1%. Migration accounted for 1.2%, while births and deaths accounted for -0.2%.

Most of the population (as of 2000) speaks German (376 or 91.5%) as their first language, French is the second most common (25 or 6.1%) and Italian is the third (2 or 0.5%).

As of 2008, the population was 49.8% male and 50.2% female. The population was made up of 189 Swiss men (46.6% of the population) and 13 (3.2%) non-Swiss men. There were 193 Swiss women (47.5%) and 1 (0.2%) non-Swiss women. Of the population in the municipality, 131 or about 31.9% were born in Merzligen and lived there in 2000. There were 199 or 48.4% who were born in the same canton, while 53 or 12.9% were born somewhere else in Switzerland, and 25 or 6.1% were born outside of Switzerland.

As of 2011, children and teenagers (0–19 years old) make up 19.3% of the population, while adults (20–64 years old) make up 54.4% and seniors (over 64 years old) make up 26.3%.

As of 2000, there were 155 people who were single and never married in the municipality. There were 224 married individuals, 22 widows or widowers and 10 individuals who are divorced.

As of 2010, there were 31 households that consist of only one person and 12 households with five or more people. In 2000, a total of 150 apartments (94.3% of the total) were permanently occupied, while 3 apartments (1.9%) were seasonally occupied and 6 apartments (3.8%) were empty. As of 2010, the construction rate of new housing units was 4.9 new units per 1000 residents. In 2011, single family homes made up 66.9% of the total housing in the municipality.

The historical population is given in the following chart:

== Politics ==
In the 2011 federal election the most popular party was the Swiss People's Party (SVP) which received 23.6% of the vote. The next three most popular parties were the Conservative Democratic Party (BDP) (23.6%), the Social Democratic Party (SP) (20.4%) and the FDP.The Liberals (10.6%). In the federal election, a total of 184 votes were cast, and the voter turnout was 56.6%.

== Economy ==
As of 2011, Merzligen had an unemployment rate of 0.42%. As of 2008, there were a total of 40 people employed in the municipality. Of these, there were 23 people employed in the primary economic sector and about 10 businesses involved in this sector. 4 people were employed in the secondary sector and there were 3 businesses in this sector. 13 people were employed in the tertiary sector, with 7 businesses in this sector. There were 214 residents of the municipality who were employed in some capacity, of which females made up 41.1% of the workforce.

In 2008 there were a total of 25 full-time equivalent jobs. The number of jobs in the primary sector was 11, all of which were in agriculture. The number of jobs in the secondary sector was 3 of which 1 was in manufacturing and 2 were in construction. The number of jobs in the tertiary sector was 11. In the tertiary sector; 3 or 27.3% were in a hotel or restaurant, 1 was in the information industry, 3 or 27.3% were technical professionals or scientists and 3 or 27.3% were in health care.

In 2000, there were 8 workers who commuted into the municipality and 175 workers who commuted away. The municipality is a net exporter of workers, with about 21.9 workers leaving the municipality for every one entering. A total of 39 workers (83.0% of the 47 total workers in the municipality) both lived and worked in Merzligen. Of the working population, 11.7% used public transportation to get to work, and 65.9% used a private car.

In 2011 the average local and cantonal tax rate on a married resident, with two children, of Merzligen making 150,000 CHF was 12.4%, while an unmarried resident's rate was 18.2%. For comparison, the rate for the entire canton in the same year, was 14.2% and 22.0%, while the nationwide rate was 12.3% and 21.1% respectively. In 2009 there were a total of 187 tax payers in the municipality. Of that total, 72 made over 75,000 CHF per year. There were 4 people who made between 15,000 and 20,000 per year. The average income of the over 75,000 CHF group in Merzligen was 115,099 CHF, while the average across all of Switzerland was 130,478 CHF.

In 2011 a total of 0.5% of the population received direct financial assistance from the government.

== Religion ==
From the 2000 census, 306 or 74.5% belonged to the Swiss Reformed Church, while 33 or 8.0% were Roman Catholic. Of the rest of the population, there were 17 individuals (or about 4.14% of the population) who belonged to another Christian church. There was 1 individual who was Islamic. There were 2 individuals who were Buddhist and 6 individuals who were Hindu. 41 (or about 9.98% of the population) belonged to no church, are agnostic or atheist, and 5 individuals (or about 1.22% of the population) did not answer the question.

== Education ==
In Merzligen about 58.2% of the population have completed non-mandatory upper secondary education, and 22.6% have completed additional higher education (either university or a Fachhochschule). Of the 59 who had completed some form of tertiary schooling listed in the census, 74.6% were Swiss men, 23.7% were Swiss women.

As of 2000, there was one student living in Merzligen and attending some form of schooling in the municipality. A total of 61 students from Merzligen attended schools outside the municipality.
