= Bellmund =

- Municipality
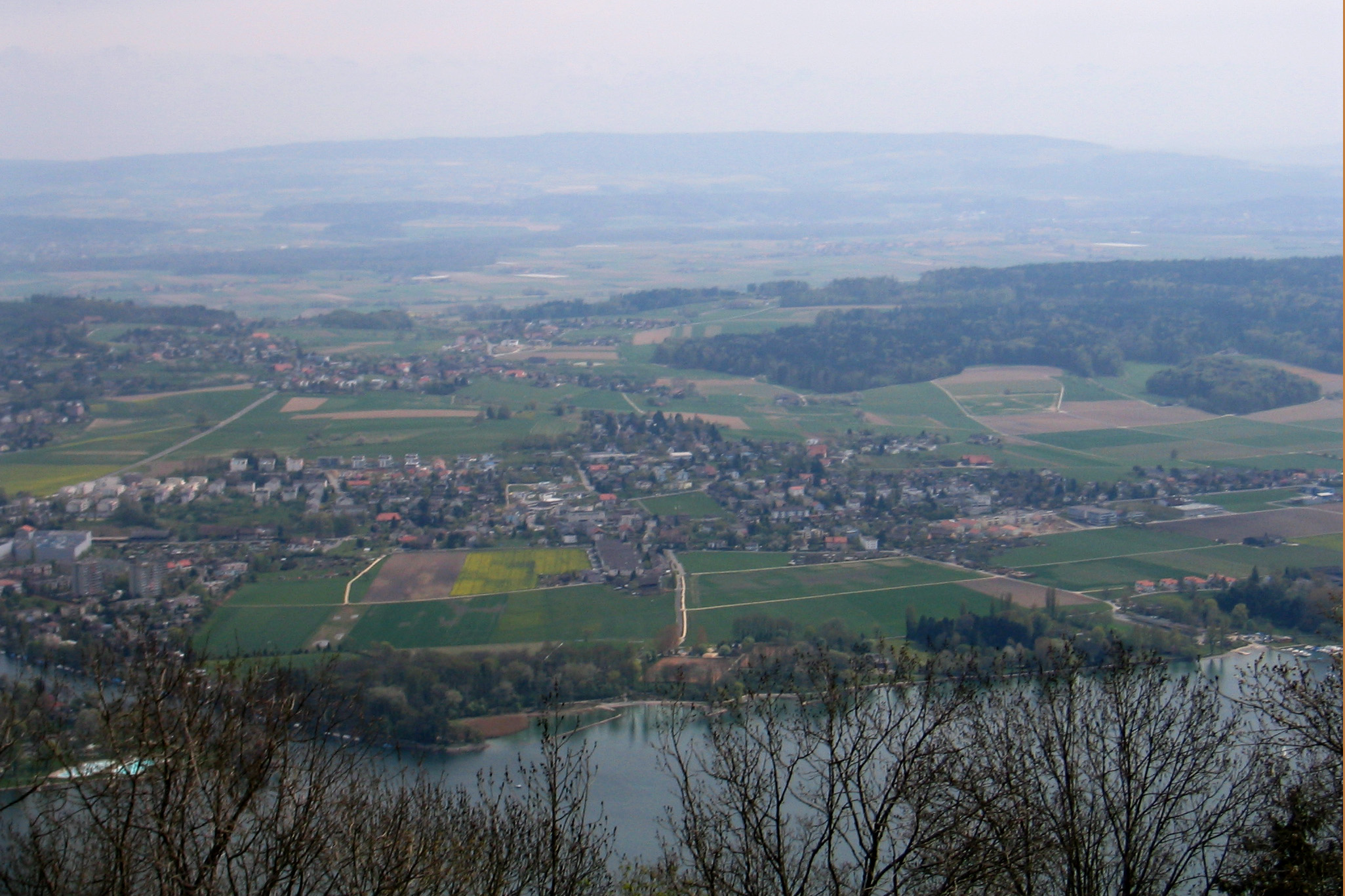
- Ipsach as seen from the lake; Bellmund is to the rear.

- Flag Coat of arms
- Location of Bellmund
- Location within Switzerland Location within Canton of Bern
- Coordinates: 47°6′N 7°15′E
- Country: Switzerland
- Canton: Bern
- District: Biel/Bienne

Government
  - Executive: Gemeinderat with 6 (Note: The Secretary of the Council is also a part of the Gemeinderat.) members
  - Mayor: Gemeindepräsident; Matthias Gygax (as of 2026)

Area
  - Total: 3.8 km^{2} (1.5 sq mi)
- Elevation: 499 m (1,637 ft)

Population (2020)
  - Total: 1,723
  - Density: 450/km^{2} (1,200/sq mi)
- Time zone: UTC+01:00 (CET)
  - Summer (DST): UTC+02:00 (CEST)
- Postal code: 2564
- SFOS number: 732
- ISO 3166 code: CH-BE
- Surrounded by: Hermrigen, Ipsach, Jens, Merzligen, Port, Sutz-Lattrigen
- Twin towns: Dobronin (Czech Republic)
- Website: https://www.bellmund.ch/

Bellmund (French: Belmont) is a municipality in the Biel/Bienne administrative district in the canton of Bern in Switzerland.

== History ==
Bellmund is first mentioned in 1107 as Bellus mons. In 1228 it was mentioned as Belmunt. The municipality was formerly known by its French name Belmont though that name is rarely used.

The oldest traces of a settlement in the area are a few, scattered neolithic items found on the Jensberg hill. Later traces include Roman era iron ingots which were found in the Wilerholz and the remains of what may have been a Roman road to Sutz. A few early medieval graves were found in the modern village. During the High Middle Ages, Knebelburg Castle (also spelled Chnebelburg) was built on the Jensberg. By 1107 the royal family of Burgundy founded a Cluniac priory near the village. In 1127, the priory moved to St. Peter's Island in the nearby Lake Biel. The village was part of the Herrschaft of Nidau and came partly under Bernese control in 1388 and fully in 1393.

The first village church was mentioned in 1228. It collapsed in 1509. When the Protestant Reformation came to Bellmund in 1528, the village accepted the new faith and became part of the parish of Nidau.

It used to lie on the old highway between Bern, Aarberg and Nidau. In 1864 the new Bern-Lyss-Biel railroad and then the Bern-Lyss-Biel highway replaced the old highway and bypassed Bellmund. Because of this, the village remained generally isolated and agrarian. In the 1950s, Biel began to expand and Bellmund slowly became a commuter town of Biel. In 1980 the Stöckleren development was built to provide housing for the growing population.

== Geography ==
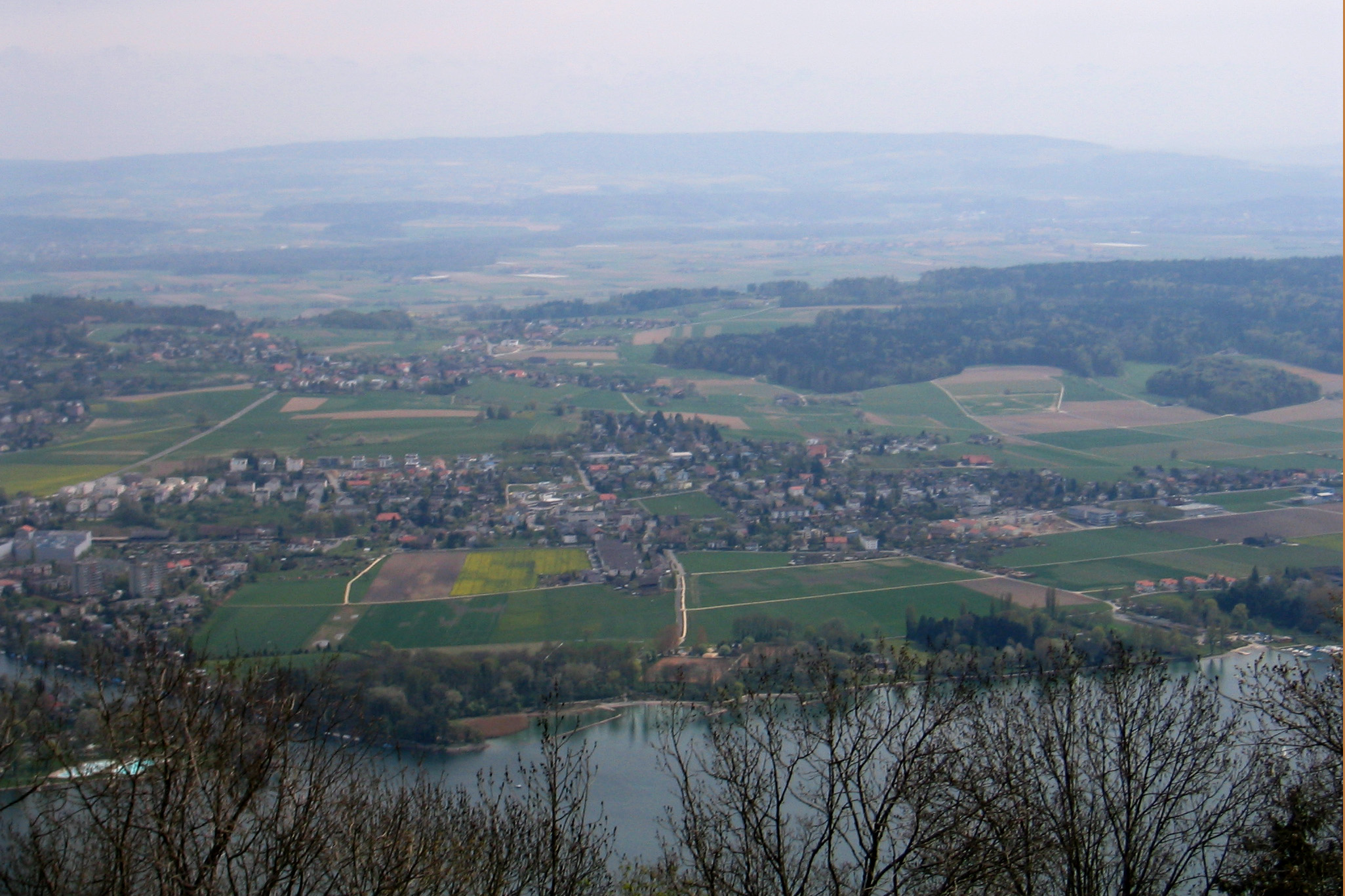
View of Ipsach in the center of the picture and Bellmund in the background toward the left.

Bellmund has an area of 3.8 km^{2} (1.47 sq mi). As of 2012, a total of 1.98 km^{2} (0.76 mi^{2}) or 52.1% is used for agricultural purposes, while 1.26 km^{2} (0.49 mi^{2}) or 33.2% is forested. Of the rest of the land, 0.56 km^{2} (0.22 mi^{2}) or 14.7% is settled (buildings or roads), 0.01 km^{2} (2.5 acres) or 0.3% is either rivers or lakes.

The same year, housing and buildings made up 9.7% and transportation infrastructure made up 2.9%. while parks, green belts and sports fields made up 1.3%. All of the forested land area is covered with heavy forest. Of the agricultural land, 38.9% is used for growing crops and 10.5% is pastures, while 2.6% is used for orchards or vine crops. All the water in the municipality is flowing water.

The municipality is located in the Berner Seeland south of Biel, between the Oberholz and Jensberg hills. It consists of the village of Bellmund and part of the hamlets of St. Niklaus.

On 31 December 2009 Amtsbezirk Nidau, the municipality's former district, was dissolved and, the next day, joined the newly created Verwaltungskreis Biel/Bienne.

== Coat of arms ==
The blazon of the municipal coat of arms is Quartered Gules and Argent a Crozier of the last in bend between two Suns of the first.

== Demographics ==
Bellmund has a population (as of December 2020) of 1,723. As of 2010, 5.9% of the population were resident foreign nationals. In the decade from 2001 to 2011, the population increased at a rate of 4.3%. Migration accounted for 4.2%, while births and deaths accounted for -0.1%.

In 2000, most of the population spoke German (1,098 or 89.9%) as their first language, French being the second most common (76 or 6.2%) and Italian third (20 or 1.6%). At that time, there were 471 people who were single and never married in the municipality. There were 666 married individuals, 42 widows or widowers and 42 individuals who are divorced.

As of 2008, the population was 50.2% male and 49.8% female. The population was made up of 689 Swiss men (47.0% of the population) and 47 (3.2%) non-Swiss men. There were 689 Swiss women (47.0%) and 4 (0.3%) non-Swiss women. Of the population in the municipality, 266 or about 21.8% were born in Bellmund and lived there in 2000. There were 588 or 48.2% who were born in the same canton, while 224 or 18.3% were born somewhere else in Switzerland, and 117 or 9.6% were born outside of Switzerland.

As of 2011, children and teenagers (0–19 years old) make up 23.9% of the population, while adults (20–64 years old) make up 60.6% and seniors (over 64 years old) make up 15.5%. There were 104 households that consist of only one person and 38 households with five or more people. In 2000, a total of 455 apartments (95.0% of the total) were permanently occupied, while 16 apartments (3.3%) were seasonally occupied and 8 apartments (1.7%) were empty. As of 2010, the construction rate of new housing units was 4.8 new units per 1000 residents. The vacancy rate for the municipality, in 2012, was 1.43%. In 2011, single family homes made up 79.2% of the total housing in the municipality.

The historical population is given in the following chart:

== Politics ==
In the 2011 federal election the most popular party was the Swiss People's Party (SVP) which received 26.9% of the vote. The next three most popular parties were the FDP.The Liberals (16.6%), the Social Democratic Party (SP) (16.6%) and the Conservative Democratic Party (BDP) (15%). In the federal election, a total of 597 votes were cast, and the voter turnout was 53.0%.

== Economy ==
As of 2011, Bellmund had an unemployment rate of 1.76%. As of 2008, there were a total of 305 people employed in the municipality. Of these, there were 29 people employed in the primary economic sector and about 11 businesses involved in this sector. 214 people were employed in the secondary sector and there were 12 businesses in this sector. 62 people were employed in the tertiary sector, with 17 businesses in this sector. There were 649 residents of the municipality who were employed in some capacity, of which females made up 43.3% of the workforce.

In 2000, there were 122 workers who commuted into the municipality and 557 workers who commuted away. The municipality is a net exporter of workers, with about 4.6 workers leaving the municipality for every one entering. A total of 92 workers (43.0% of the 214 total workers in the municipality) both lived and worked in Bellmund. Of the working population, 17.4% used public transportation to get to work, and 63.2% used a private car.

In 2008 there were a total of 270 full-time equivalent jobs. The number of jobs in the primary sector was 18, all of which were in agriculture. The number of jobs in the secondary sector was 205 of which 51 or (24.9%) were in manufacturing and 154 (75.1%) were in construction. The number of jobs in the tertiary sector was 47. In the tertiary sector; 24 or 51.1% were in wholesale or retail sales or the repair of motor vehicles, 3 or 6.4% were in the movement and storage of goods, 5 or 10.6% were in a hotel or restaurant, 1 was in the information industry, 1 was a technical professional or scientist, 6 or 12.8% were in education.

In 2011 the average local and cantonal tax rate on a married resident, with two children, of Bellmund making 150,000 CHF was 11.6%, while an unmarried resident's rate was 17%. For comparison, the rate for the entire canton in the same year, was 14.2% and 22.0%, while the nationwide rate was 12.3% and 21.1%, respectively. In 2009 there was a total of 603 tax payers in the municipality. Of that total, 321 made over 75,000 CHF per year. There were 6 people who made between 15,000 and 20,000 per year. The average income of the over 75,000 CHF group in Bellmund was 148,824 CHF, while the average across all of Switzerland was 130,478 CHF.

In 2011 a total of 1.0% of the population received direct financial assistance from the government.

== Religion ==
From the 2000 census, 812 or 66.5% belonged to the Swiss Reformed Church, while 207 or 17.0% were Roman Catholic. Of the rest of the population, there were 7 members of an Orthodox church (or about 0.57% of the population), and there were 47 individuals (or about 3.85% of the population) who belonged to another Christian church. There were 4 individuals (or about 0.33% of the population) who were Jewish, and 9 (or about 0.74% of the population) who were Islamic. There were 4 individuals who were Buddhist. 97 (or about 7.94% of the population) belonged to no church, are agnostic or atheist, and 34 individuals (or about 2.78% of the population) did not answer the question.

== Education ==
In Bellmund about 54.8% of the population have completed non-mandatory upper secondary education, and 30.1% have completed additional higher education (either university or a Fachhochschule). Of the 239 who had completed some form of tertiary schooling listed in the census, 65.7% were Swiss men, 27.2% were Swiss women, 3.8% were non-Swiss men and 3.3% were non-Swiss women.

The Canton of Bern school system provides one year of non-obligatory kindergarten, followed by six years of primary school. This is followed by three years of obligatory lower secondary school where the students are separated according to ability and aptitude. Thereafter, the lower secondary students may attend additional schooling or they may enter an apprenticeship.

During the 2011–12 school year, there were 156 students attending classes in Bellmund. There were 2 kindergarten classes with a total of 35 students in the municipality. Of the kindergarten students, 11.4% were permanent or temporary residents of Switzerland (not citizens) and 11.4% have a different mother language than the classroom language. The municipality had 6 primary classes and 121 students. Of the primary students, 5.0% were permanent or temporary residents of Switzerland (not citizens) and 9.9% had a different mother language than the classroom language.

As of 2000, there were a total of 117 students attending any school in the municipality. Of those, 116 both lived and attended school in the municipality, while one student came from another municipality. During the same year, 100 residents attended schools outside the municipality.
