= Seeland (Switzerland) =

Region in Switzerland

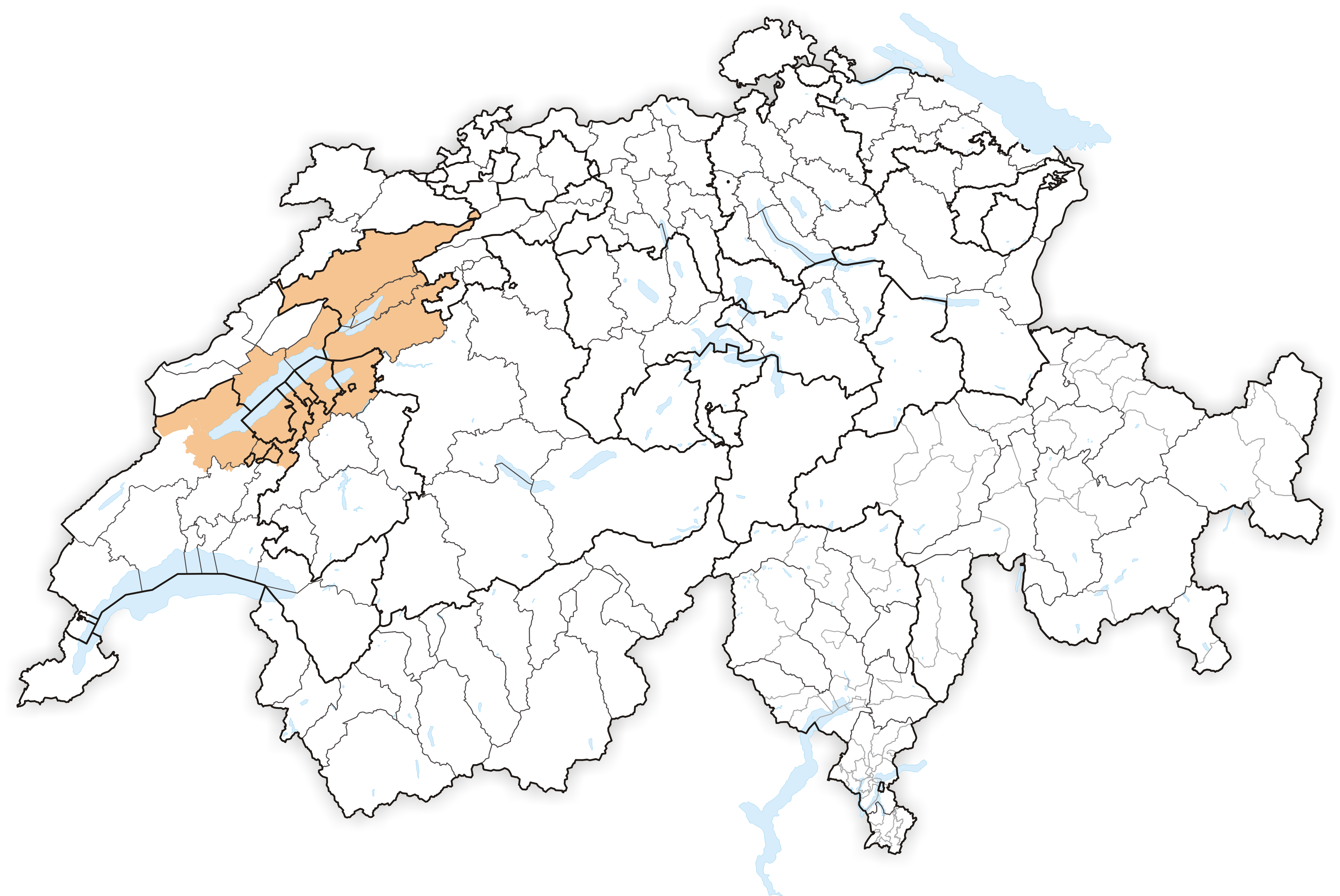
Seeland region in Switzerland

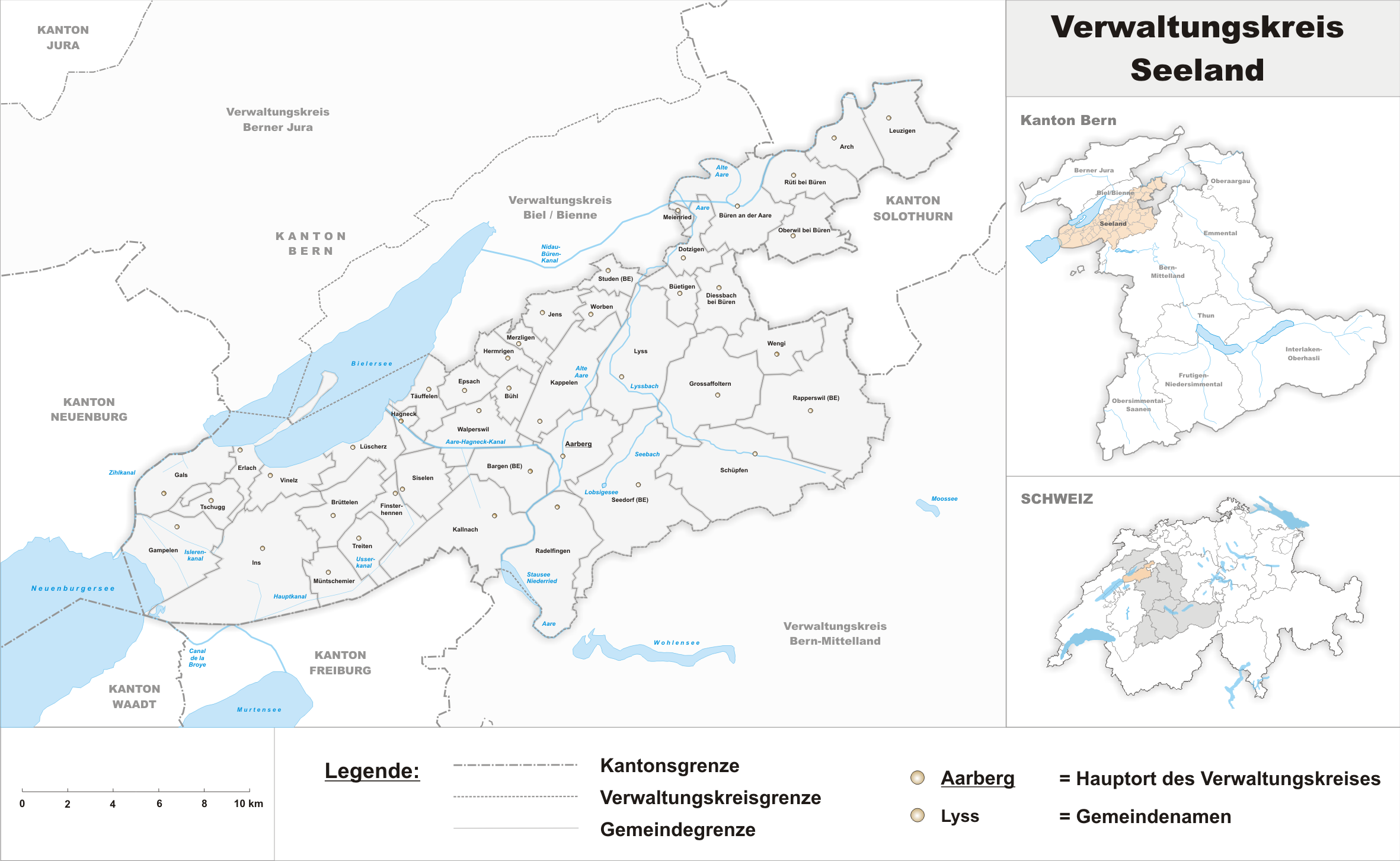
Borders of the Bernese administrative district

Seeland (lit.: Lakeland, also German: Drei-Seen-Land, French: Pays des trois lacs) is a region in Switzerland, at the south-eastern foot of the mountain range of the Jura Mountains containing the 3 Lakes of Morat, Neuchâtel, and Bienne (Biel). In previous eras, it was the floodplain of the Aare and was thus swampy. After major hydrological works (the Jura water correction), the area drained out and could support more cultivation. Seeland is one of the most important regions in Switzerland for growing vegetables, particularly in the Grand Marais (lit.: Large Marshland, German: Grosses Moos).

The region is at the boundary of the cantons of Bern, Fribourg, Neuchâtel, and Vaud, forming part of the linguistic boundary region between French- and German-speaking Switzerland.

The Bernese Seeland is one of five administrative divisions (regions) in the canton of Bern with a population of 76,052 (as of 2020) in 46 municipalities.

== Bernese Seeland ==
During the Ancien Régime Bern acquired the rural bailiwicks or counties of Aarberg, Büren an der Aare, Erlach and Nidau from the estates of the Lords of Aarberg-Valangin, Strassberg-Büren, Nidau and the Counts of Neuchâtel. Between 1595 and 1628 they were combined militarily into the so-called Seefähnchen. However, they were politically separate. It was not until 1783-84 that Johann Friedrich von Ryhiner's administrative compendium of the Bernese State presented the four counties as a united region. The Bernese Seeland expanded in 1815 when the city of Biel/Bienne and the surrounding lands of the Prince-Bishop of Basel were given to the Canton of Bern.

During the Helvetic Republic (1798–1803), the borders of the Seeland shrunk to the Amt of Erlach and portions of the Amts of Nidau and Aarberg. Between 1803 and 1815 it was a Grand Council of Bern election district with the Amts of Fraubrunnen and Wangen and portions of the Amts of Bern and Burgdorf. Between 1850 and 1918 it formed a National Council of Switzerland constituency, made up of Laupen and Biel. From 1869 to 1921 it was again a Grand Council of Bern election district made up of the Amts of Biel, Aarberg, Laupen and the northern portion of Bern. In 2010, the Seeland region was created with the Districts of Biel and Seeland. The new Seeland district (Verwaltungskreise) was made up of all or part of the former districts of Aarberg, Büren, Erlach and Nidau

The Bernese Seeland consists of two differing landscapes. The lake shore areas were occupied as far back as the Neolithic, such as the UNESCO World Heritage Site pile dwellings at Twann from about 3800 BC. The lake shore areas were easily settled and fishing dominated the local economies. During the Middle Ages vineyards were added on the slopes of the Jura Mountains above the lakes. In contrast, the plains and the Grosses Moos swamp were crossed by meandering rivers like the Aare and Thielle which frequently flooded making the land hostile to settlements. The villages on the edges of the swamp, used the swamp mainly for grazing. However, following the Jura water correction projects the bogs were drained and the formerly useless swamps became excellent farming land.

With the improved transport infrastructure of the 19th and 20th centuries, the Seeland began to develop into an industrialized region. The town of Biel/Bienne rose to be the economic center of the Seeland, along with the business and industrial centers of Brügg, Lyss and Ins. The region became known for specializing in watches, precision machinery and the communication industry. The region is home to the Berne University of Applied Sciences (BFH), Department of Architecture, Wood and Civil Engineering in Biel/Bienne. This is the only school of architecture in Switzerland.

== Images ==
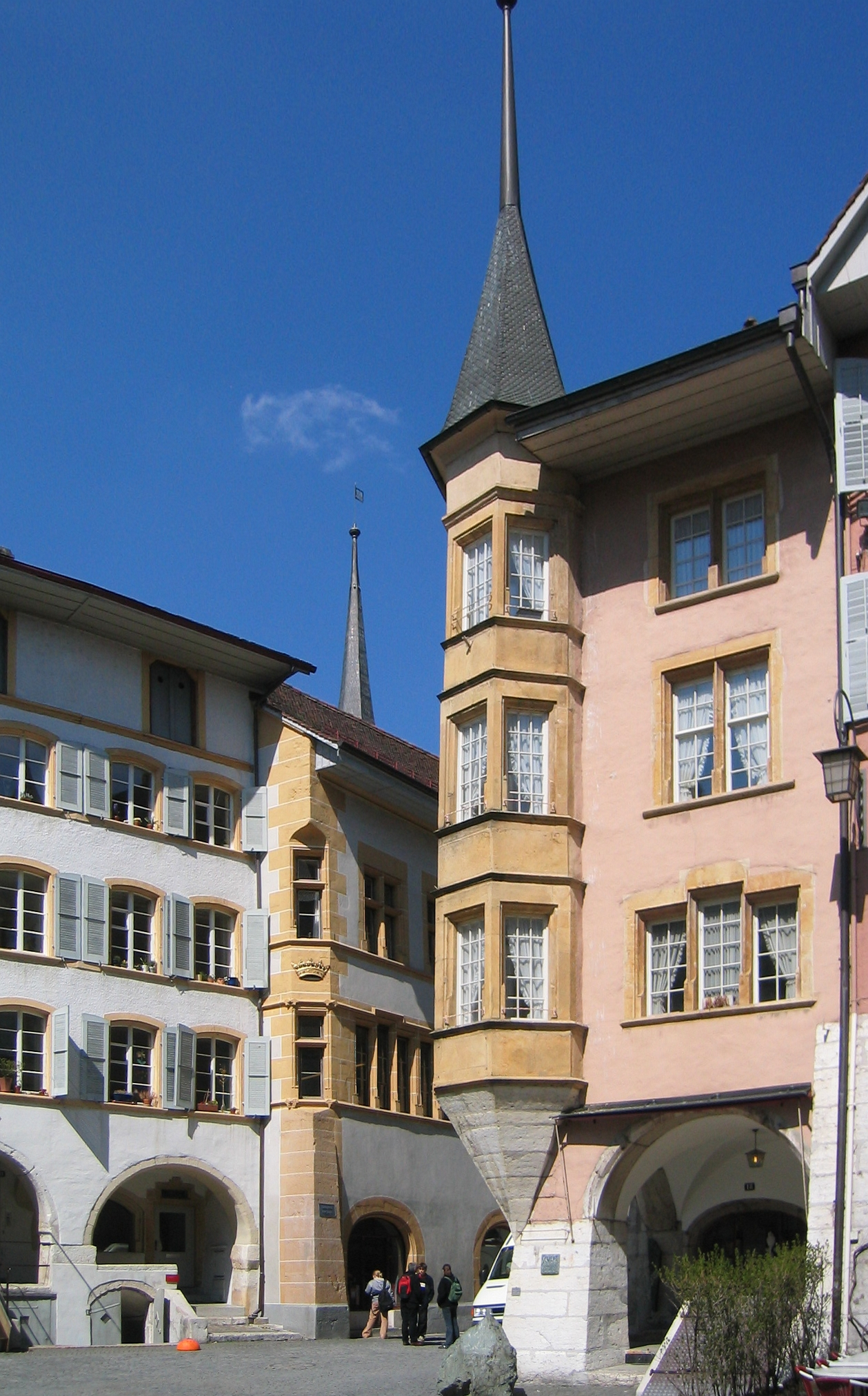
Biel/Bienne

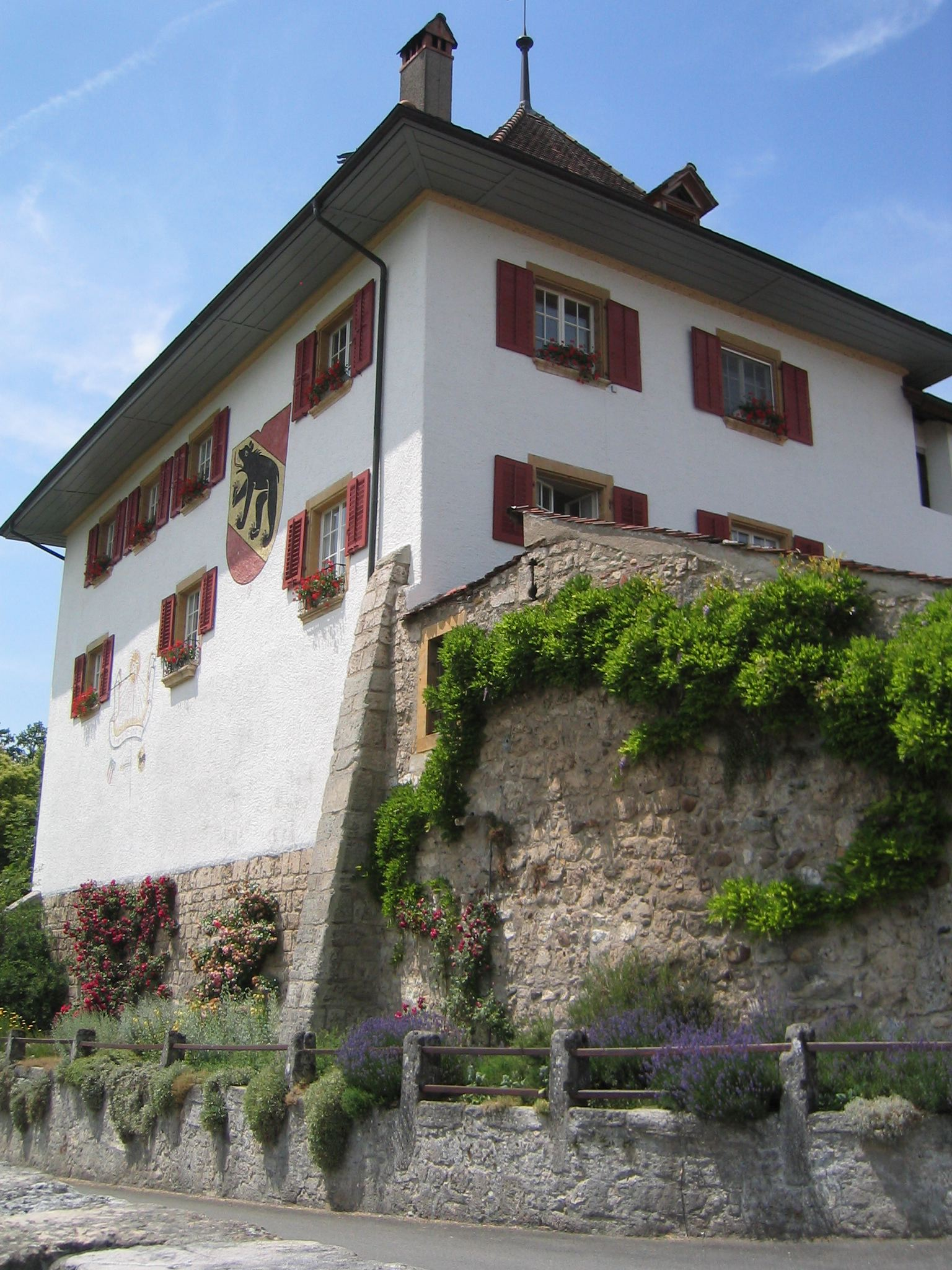
Erlach Castle

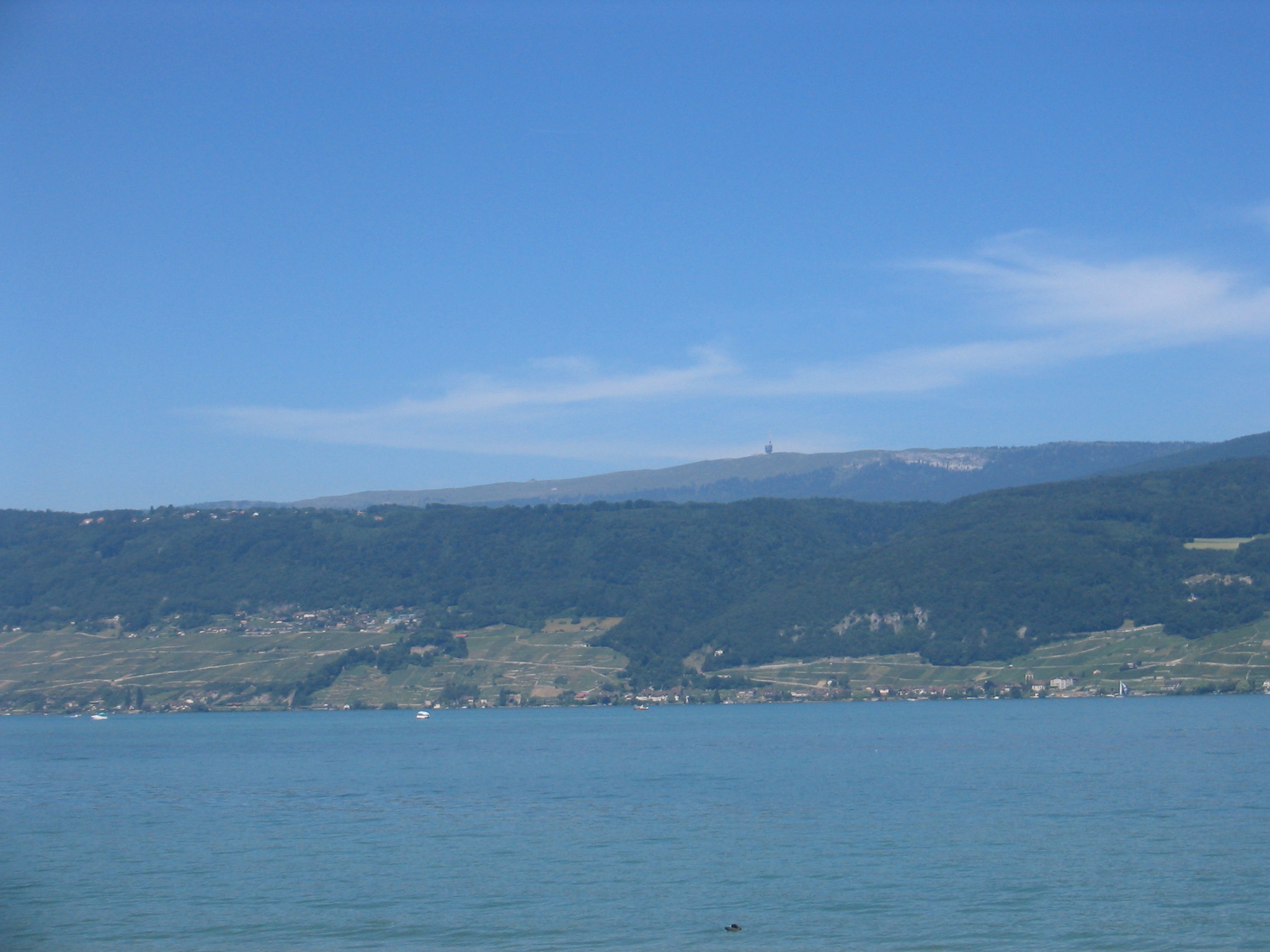
Chasseral

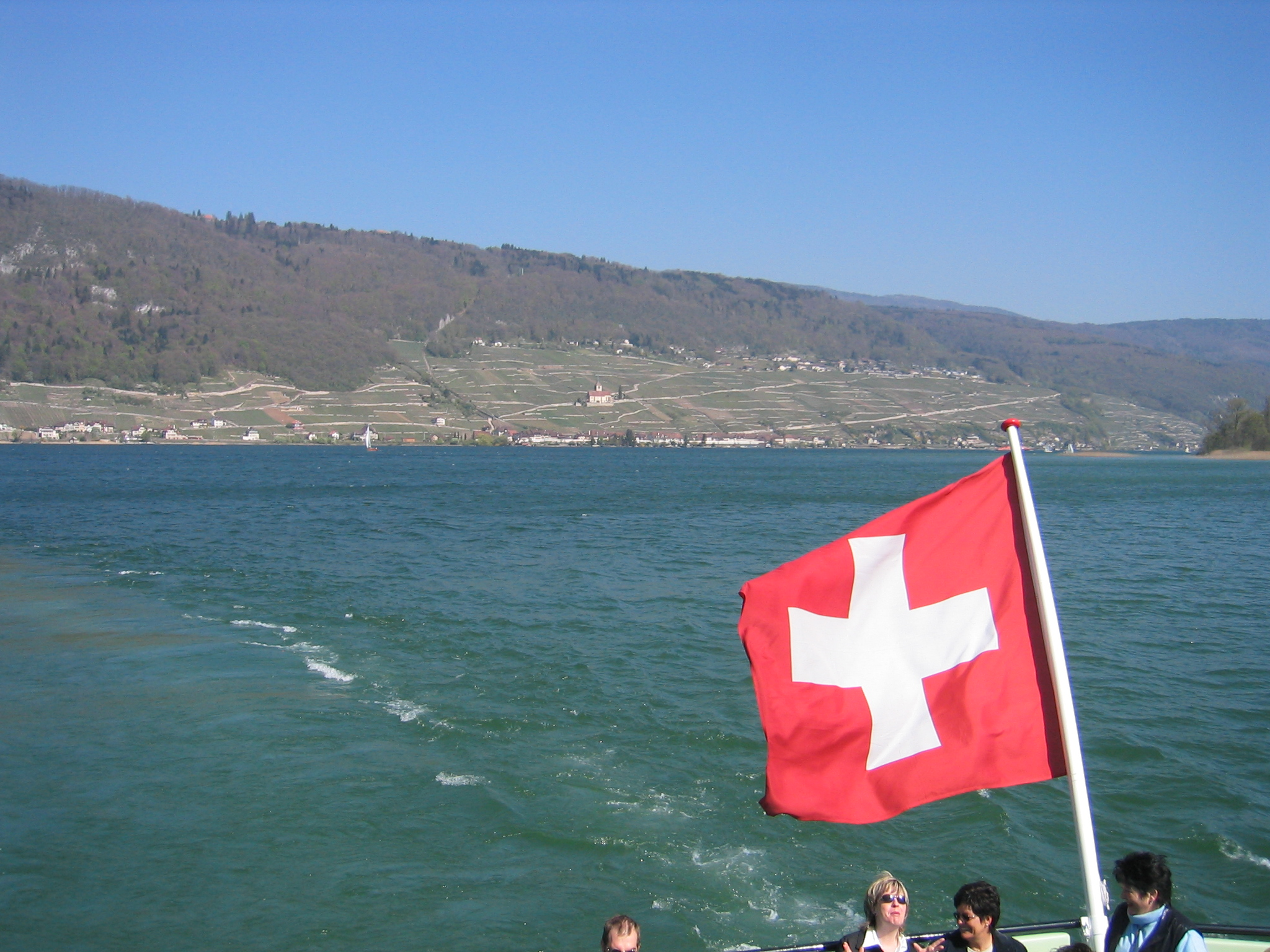
Lake Biel

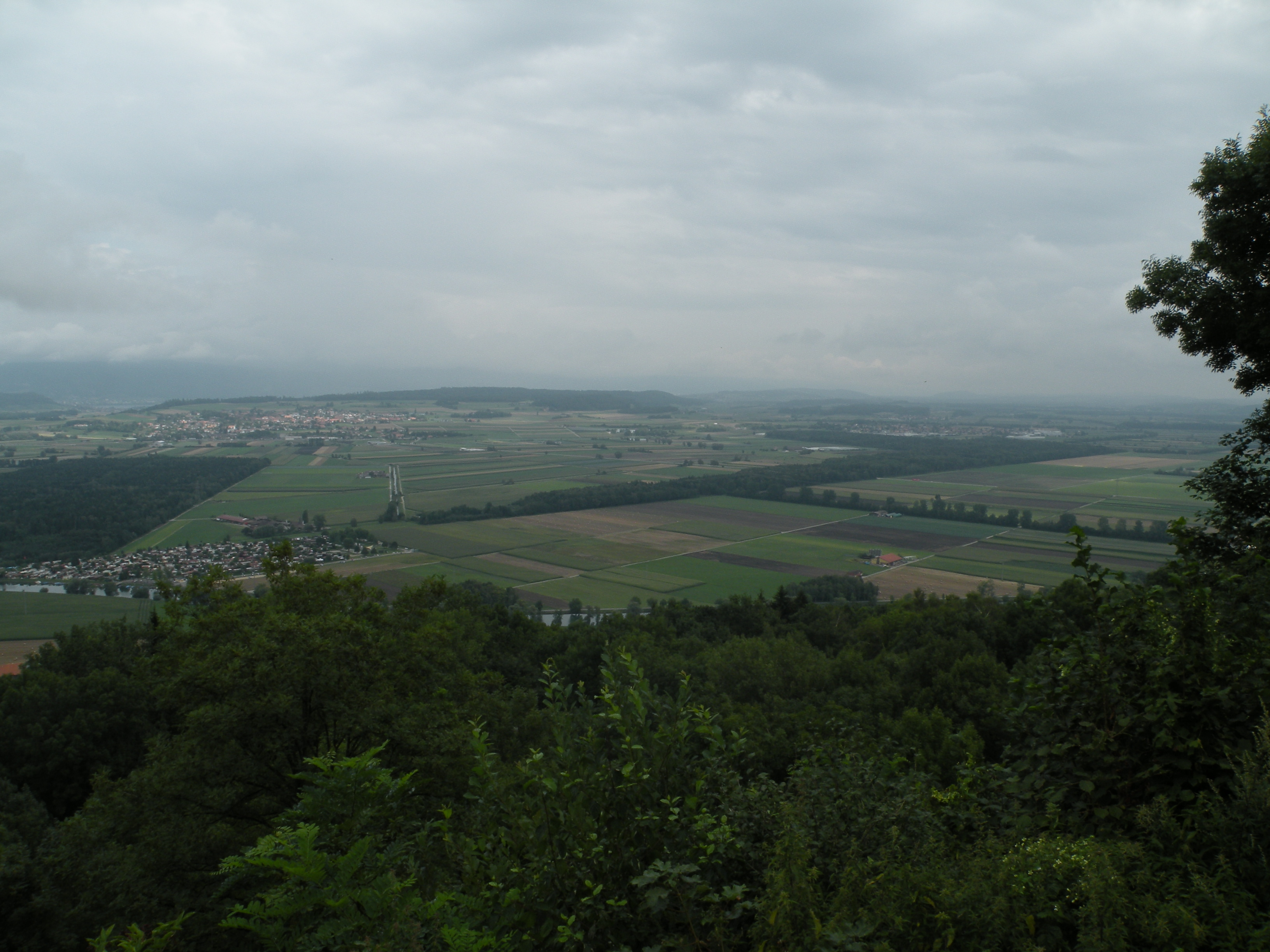
Seeland seen from Mont Vully
