= Port, Switzerland =

Port
- Municipality
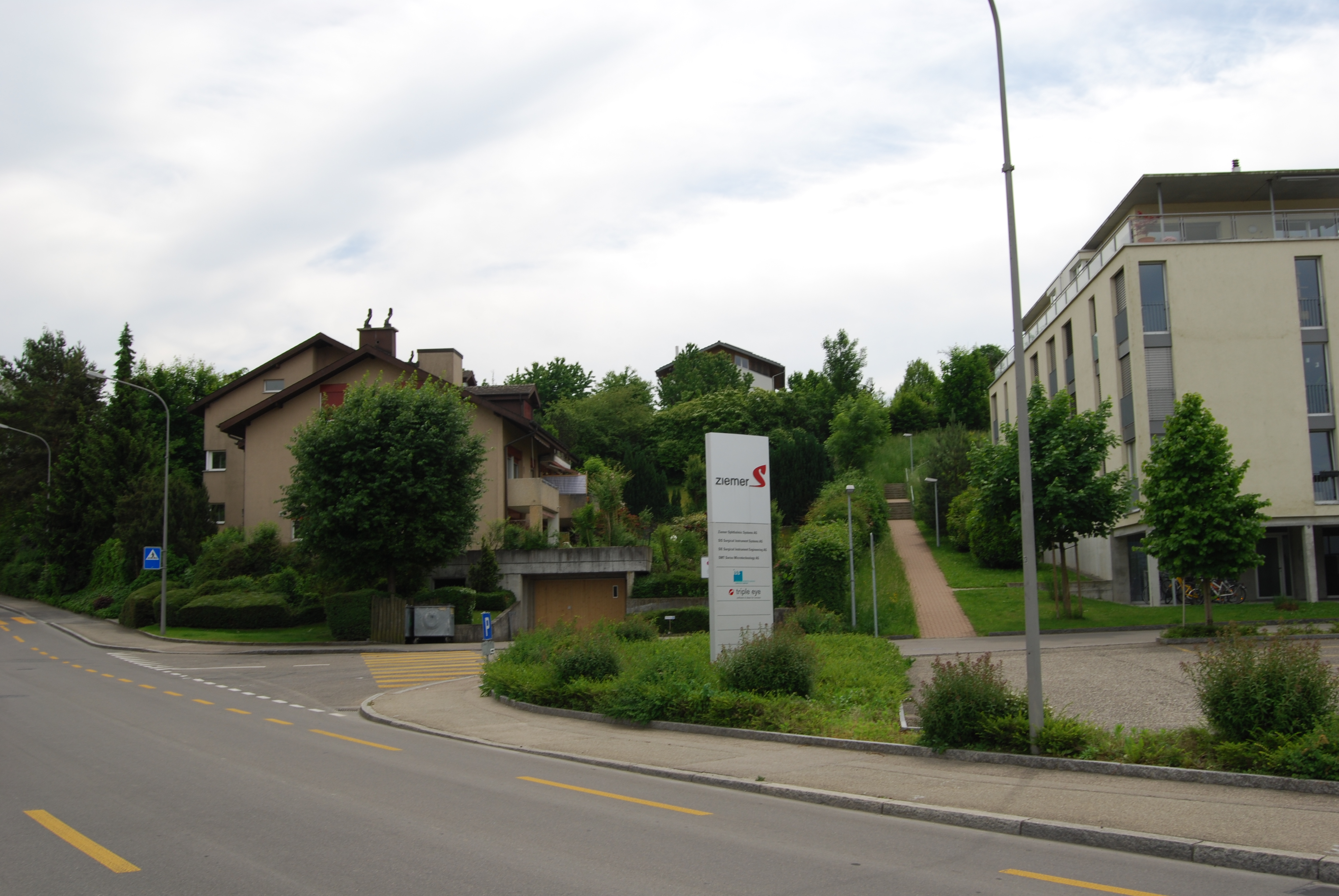

- Flag Coat of arms
- Location of Port
- Location within Switzerland Location within Canton of Bern
- Coordinates: 47°7′N 7°15′E
- Country: Switzerland
- Canton: Bern
- District: Biel/Bienne

Government
  - Executive: Gemeinderat with 9 members
  - Mayor: Gemeindepräsident; Simon Loosli SVP/UDC (as of 2026)

Area
  - Total: 2.5 km^{2} (0.97 sq mi)
- Elevation: 448 m (1,470 ft)

Population (December 2020)
  - Total: 3,801
  - Density: 1,500/km^{2} (3,900/sq mi)
- Time zone: UTC+01:00 (CET)
  - Summer (DST): UTC+02:00 (CEST)
- Postal code: 2562
- SFOS number: 745
- ISO 3166 code: CH-BE
- Surrounded by: Aegerten, Bellmund, Biel/Bienne, Brügg, Ipsach, Jens, Nidau
- Website: www.port.ch

Port is a municipality in the canton of Bern in Switzerland, located in the Biel/Bienne administrative district.

== History ==
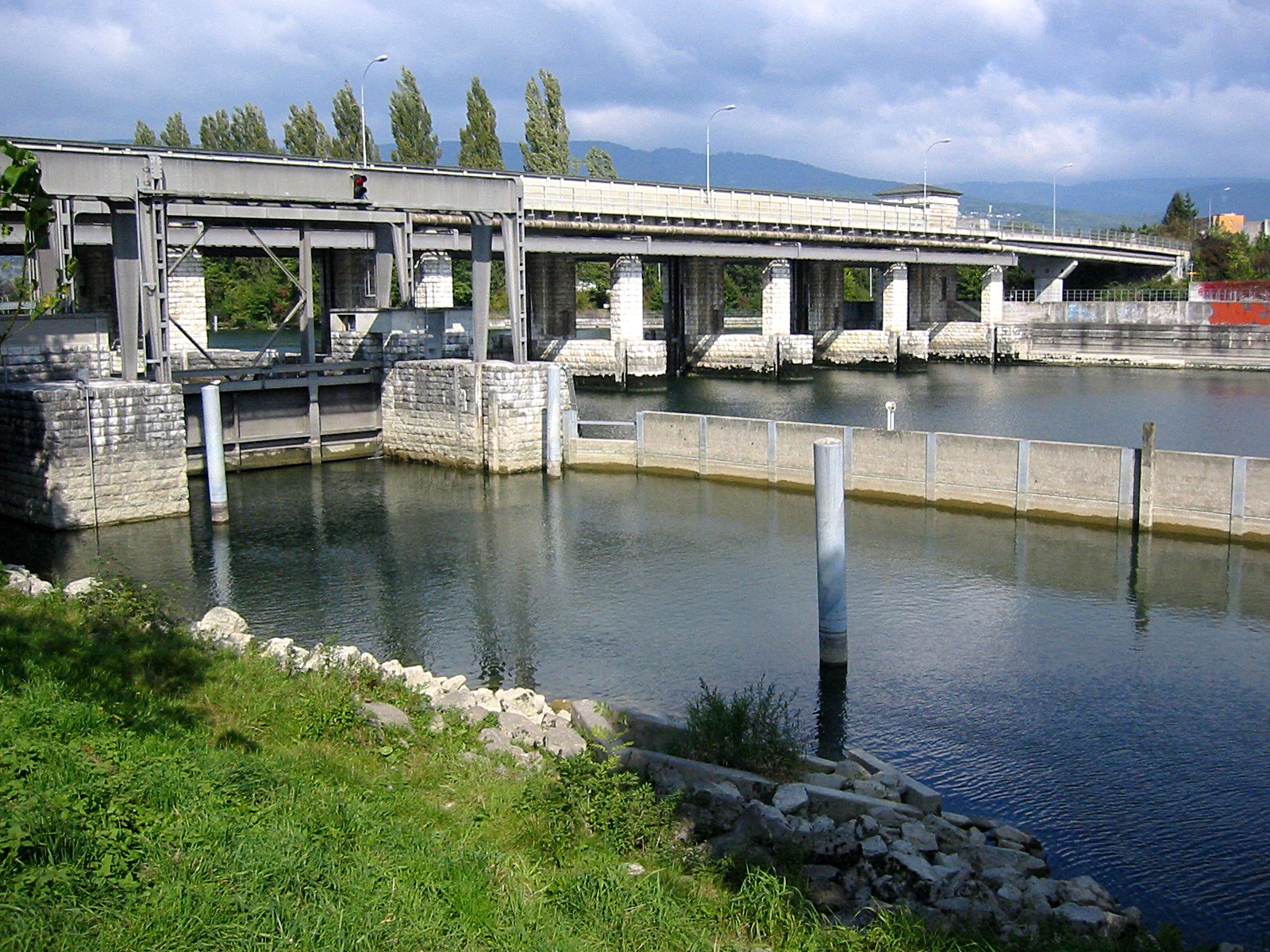
Regulation dam and the Nidau-Büren Canal

Port is first mentioned in 1228 as Port.

The banks of the Zihl/Thielle river were inhabited since at least the Neolithic. The remains of a Neolithic Cortaillod culture stilt house village from the second quarter of the 4th Millennium BC were discovered in the Stüdeli area. The area was resettled often during the following millennia. From Bronze Age settlements a number of artifacts were discovered including swords, spearheads, axes and sickles. A Celtic settlement from the 2nd and 1st centuries BC left behind two helmets, metal vessels and about 120 swords and spearheads. However, most of the swords were broken or bent. One bent iron sword contains an engraving, in Greek letters, of the name Korisios. This is considered the oldest written document in Switzerland. Wooden pilings from the same era indicate that the settlement built a bridge over the river. Scattered tools and weapons from the Roman era, the Early Middle Ages and more recently indicate that the area remained settled.

By the 12th century Port was owned by the Counts of Neuchâtel, and in the 13th century the Counts of Neuchâtel-Nidau. After that line died out, the Inselgau region, including Port, was acquired by Fribourg in 1382. They held it for a short while before Bern acquired the Inselgau in 1398, where it remained. The construction of the Nidau-Büren Canal isolated the Portmoos section from the rest of Port. A suspension bridge was eventually built to connect Port and Portmoos. In the 1950s Port became a suburb of the nearby city of Biel. An attempt to annex Port into Biel was defeated by the Grand Council of Bern in 1950-51. The sections of Portmoos and Spärs became industrial centers in Port. Today almost 80% of jobs in Port are in industry, though about 83% of the population commutes to jobs in Biel and Nidau. As the population grew, municipal schools opened in 1954 and in 1968-71.

The village church was first mentioned in 1228 as a filial church to the parish church in Nidau. In 1453 it became part of the parish of Bellmund. When Bern adopted the Protestant Reformation in 1528, the church was closed and Port became part of the Reformed parish of Bürglen. About a decade later, in 1539, Port joined the Nidau parish. The village church was last mentioned as a building in 1588. A small infirmary chapel became a chapel with cemetery in 1825-26. This chapel was rebuilt and renovated several times in the 20th century.

== Geography ==
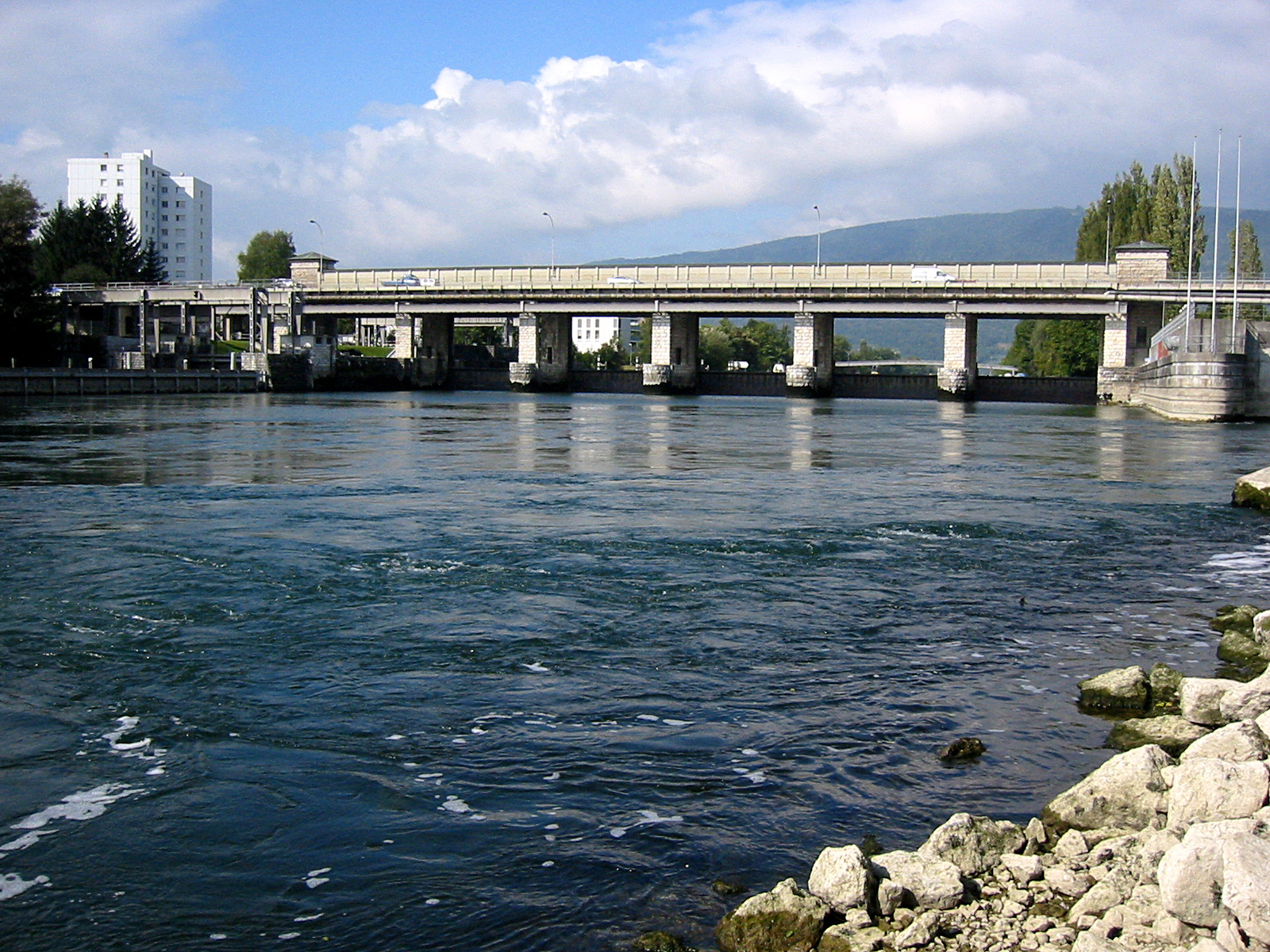
Regulating dam of Port and the Nidau-Büren Canal at Port

Port has an area of 2.46 km^{2} (0.95 sq mi). As of 2014, a total of 0.52 km^{2} (0.20 mi^{2}) or 21.1% is used for agricultural purposes, while 0.73 km^{2} (0.28 mi^{2}) or 29.7% is forested. Of the rest of the land, 1.09 km^{2} (0.42 mi^{2}) or 44.3% is settled (buildings or roads), 0.1 km^{2} (25 acres) or 4.1% is either rivers or lakes.

During the same year, industrial buildings made up 3.7% of the total area while housing and buildings made up 26.8% and transportation infrastructure made up 6.1%. while parks, green belts and sports fields made up 4.5%. Out of the forested land, all of the forested land area is covered with heavy forests. Of the agricultural land, 14.6% is used for growing crops and 4.9% is pastures, while 1.6% is used for orchards or vine crops. All the water in the municipality is flowing water.

The town lies on the Nidau-Büren channel, which links Lake Biel with Solothurn, dug out during the Jura water correction. Since then the community has been split into two parts on either side of the canal. The regulating dam Port, commissioned in 1939 and a small foot bridge, erected in the 1980s, connect both sides. The municipality stretches from the channel to the slopes of the Jensberg hill.

On 31 December 2009 Amtsbezirk Nidau, the municipality's former district, was dissolved. On the following day, 1 January 2010, it joined the newly created Verwaltungskreis Biel/Bienne.

== Coat of arms ==
The blazon of the municipal coat of arms is Argent a Roman Helmet Sable. The Roman helmet is based on a helmet which was discovered in 1890 in the Zihl/Thielle river.

== Demographics ==
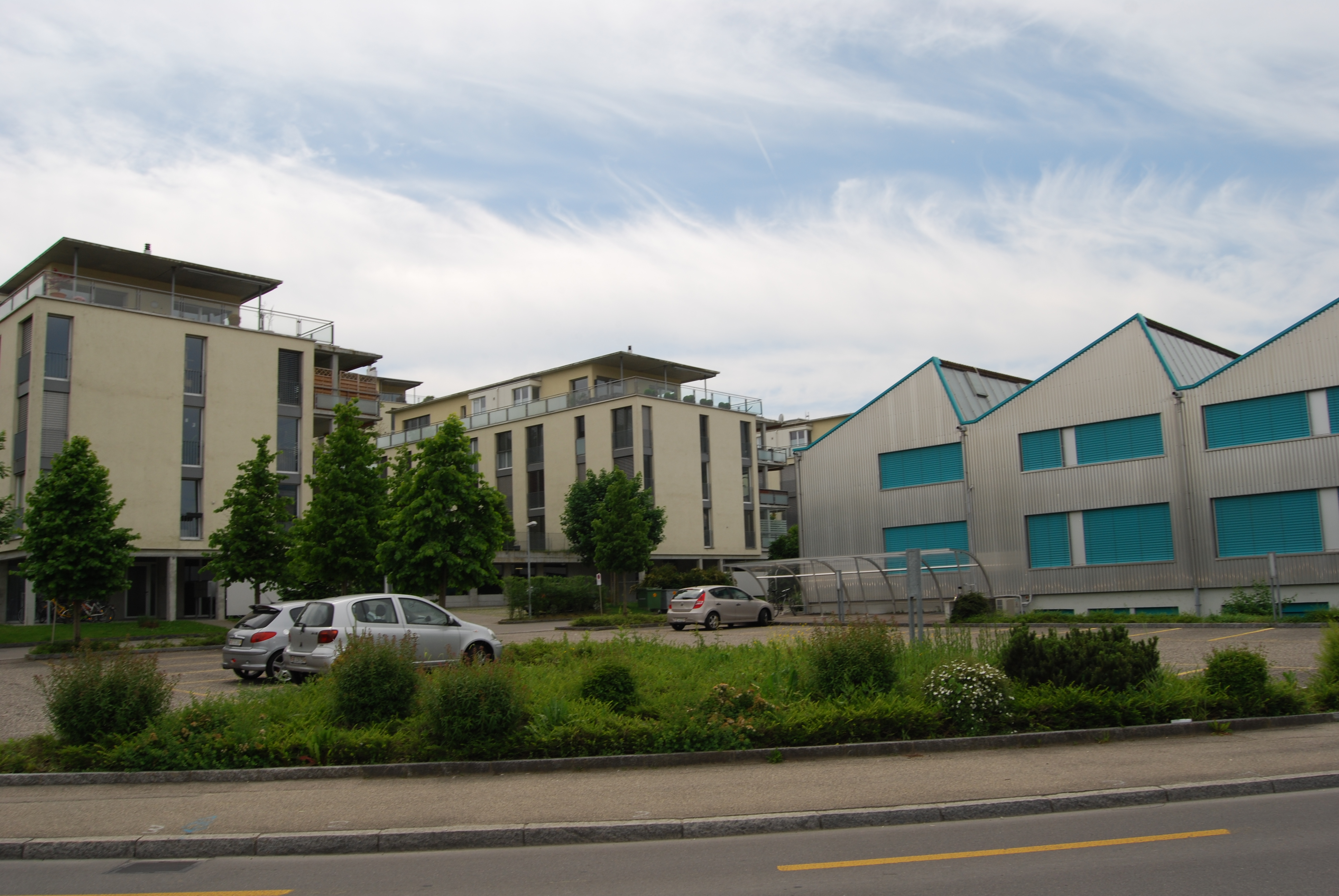
Ziemer factory and nearby apartments in Port

Port has a population (as of December 2020) of 3,801. As of 2010, 9.9% of the population are resident foreign nationals. Over the last 10 years (2001-2011) the population has changed at a rate of -1.8%. Migration accounted for -1.1%, while births and deaths accounted for -0.4%.

Most of the population (as of 2000) speaks German (2,347 or 83.9%) as their first language, French is the second most common (304 or 10.9%) and Italian is the third (44 or 1.6%). There are 2 people who speak Romansh.

As of 2008, the population was 48.4% male and 51.6% female. The population was made up of 1,422 Swiss men (43.1% of the population) and 177 (5.4%) non-Swiss men. There were 1,552 Swiss women (47.0%) and 15 (0.5%) non-Swiss women. Of the population in the municipality, 501 or about 17.9% were born in Port and lived there in 2000. There were 1,332 or 47.6% who were born in the same canton, while 586 or 20.9% were born somewhere else in Switzerland, and 299 or 10.7% were born outside of Switzerland.

As of 2011, children and teenagers (0–19 years old) make up 17.8% of the population, while adults (20–64 years old) make up 58.2% and seniors (over 64 years old) make up 24.1%.

As of 2000, there were 964 people who were single and never married in the municipality. There were 1,504 married individuals, 175 widows or widowers and 156 individuals who are divorced.

As of 2010, there were 453 households that consist of only one person and 67 households with five or more people. In 2000, a total of 1,215 apartments (94.5% of the total) were permanently occupied, while 53 apartments (4.1%) were seasonally occupied and 18 apartments (1.4%) were empty. The vacancy rate for the municipality, in 2012, was 3.38%. In 2011, single family homes made up 72.2% of the total housing in the municipality.

The historical population is given in the following chart:

== Politics ==
In the 2011 federal election the most popular party was the Swiss People's Party (SVP) which received 31% of the vote. The next three most popular parties were the Social Democratic Party (SP) (20%), the Conservative Democratic Party (BDP) (14.6%) and the FDP.The Liberals (13.5%). In the federal election, a total of 1,224 votes were cast, and the voter turnout was 50.3%.

== Economy ==
As of 2011, Port had an unemployment rate of 2.57%. As of 2008, there were a total of 902 people employed in the municipality. Of these, there were 14 people employed in the primary economic sector and about 4 businesses involved in this sector. 490 people were employed in the secondary sector and there were 36 businesses in this sector. 398 people were employed in the tertiary sector, with 77 businesses in this sector. There were 1,450 residents of the municipality who were employed in some capacity, of which females made up 43.9% of the workforce.

In 2008 there were a total of 781 full-time equivalent jobs. The number of jobs in the primary sector was 12, all of which were in agriculture. The number of jobs in the secondary sector was 456 of which 345 or (75.7%) were in manufacturing and 108 (23.7%) were in construction. The number of jobs in the tertiary sector was 313. In the tertiary sector; 107 or 34.2% were in wholesale or retail sales or the repair of motor vehicles, 17 or 5.4% were in the movement and storage of goods, 21 or 6.7% were in a hotel or restaurant, 19 or 6.1% were in the information industry, 6 or 1.9% were the insurance or financial industry, 35 or 11.2% were technical professionals or scientists, 14 or 4.5% were in education and 55 or 17.6% were in health care.

In 2000, there were 542 workers who commuted into the municipality and 1,210 workers who commuted away. The municipality is a net exporter of workers, with about 2.2 workers leaving the municipality for every one entering. A total of 240 workers (30.7% of the 782 total workers in the municipality) both lived and worked in Port. Of the working population, 16.9% used public transportation to get to work, and 56.3% used a private car.

In 2011 the average local and cantonal tax rate on a married resident, with two children, of Port making 150,000 CHF was 12.3%, while an unmarried resident's rate was 18.1%. For comparison, the rate for the entire canton in the same year, was 14.2% and 22.0%, while the nationwide rate was 12.3% and 21.1% respectively. In 2009 there were a total of 1,536 tax payers in the municipality. Of that total, 618 made over 75,000 CHF per year. There were 6 people who made between 15,000 and 20,000 per year. The average income of the over 75,000 CHF group in Port was 125,656 CHF, while the average across all of Switzerland was 130,478 CHF.

In 2011 a total of 1.6% of the population received direct financial assistance from the government.

== Religion ==
From the 2000 census, 1,821 or 65.1% belonged to the Swiss Reformed Church, while 475 or 17.0% were Roman Catholic. Of the rest of the population, there were 7 members of an Orthodox church (or about 0.25% of the population), there were 4 individuals (or about 0.14% of the population) who belonged to the Christian Catholic Church, and there were 69 individuals (or about 2.47% of the population) who belonged to another Christian church. There was 1 individual who was Jewish, and 49 (or about 1.75% of the population) who were Islamic. There were 2 individuals who were Buddhist, 1 person who was Hindu and 2 individuals who belonged to another church. 284 (or about 10.15% of the population) belonged to no church, are agnostic or atheist, and 84 individuals (or about 3.00% of the population) did not answer the question.

== Education ==
In Port about 59.6% of the population have completed non-mandatory upper secondary education, and 22.2% have completed additional higher education (either university or a Fachhochschule). Of the 425 who had completed some form of tertiary schooling listed in the census, 72.7% were Swiss men, 17.9% were Swiss women, 5.6% were non-Swiss men and 3.8% were non-Swiss women.

The Canton of Bern school system provides one year of non-obligatory Kindergarten, followed by six years of Primary school. This is followed by three years of obligatory lower Secondary school where the students are separated according to ability and aptitude. Following the lower Secondary students may attend additional schooling or they may enter an apprenticeship.

During the 2011-12 school year, there were a total of 185 students attending classes in Port. There were 2 kindergarten classes with a total of 37 students in the municipality. Of the kindergarten students, 10.8% were permanent or temporary residents of Switzerland (not citizens) and 35.1% have a different mother language than the classroom language. The municipality had 8 primary classes and 148 students. Of the primary students, 8.1% were permanent or temporary residents of Switzerland (not citizens) and 20.3% have a different mother language than the classroom language.

As of 2000, there were a total of 212 students attending any school in the municipality. Of those, 198 both lived and attended school in the municipality, while 14 students came from another municipality. During the same year, 187 residents attended schools outside the municipality.
