= Studen, Bern =

Studen
- Municipality
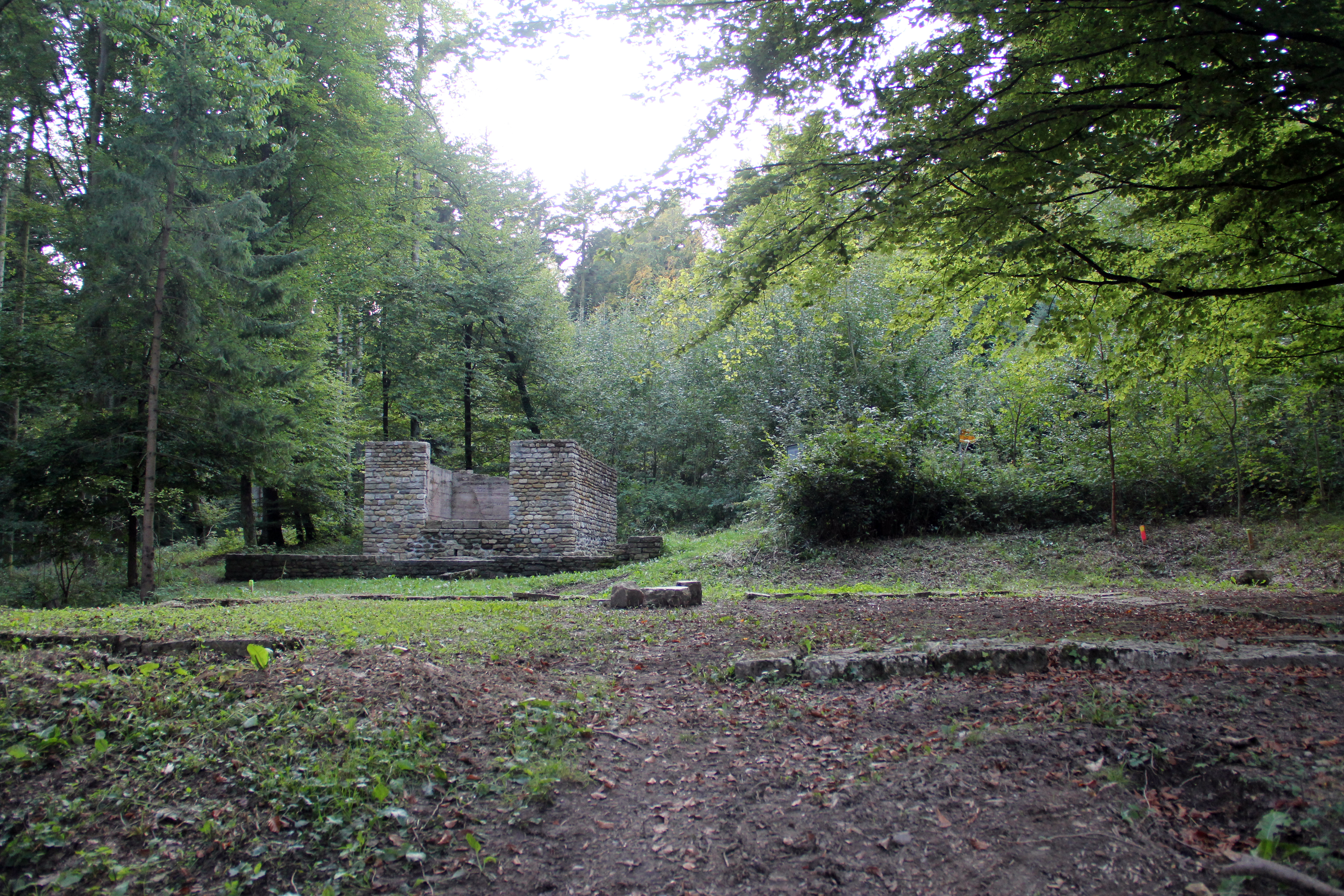
- Ruins of the Roman temple at Petinesca outside Studen village

- Flag Coat of arms
- Location of Studen
- Location within Switzerland Location within Canton of Bern
- Coordinates: 47°7′N 7°18′E
- Country: Switzerland
- Canton: Bern
- District: Seeland

Area
  - Total: 2.71 km^{2} (1.05 sq mi)
- Elevation: 437 m (1,434 ft)

Population (Dec 2011)
  - Total: 2,833
  - Density: 1,050/km^{2} (2,710/sq mi)
- Time zone: UTC+01:00 (CET)
  - Summer (DST): UTC+02:00 (CEST)
- Postal code: 2557
- SFOS number: 749
- ISO 3166 code: CH-BE
- Surrounded by: Aegerten, Büetigen, Busswil bei Büren, Jens, Schwadernau, Worben
- Website: www.studen.ch

Studen is a municipality in the Seeland administrative district in the canton of Bern in Switzerland.

== History ==
Studen is first mentioned in 1257 as Studon.

=== Petinesca: Celtic and Roman remains ===
The ruins of the Celtic and Roman settlement of Petinesca are still visible in the south-east corner of the municipality on the slopes of Jensberg mountain. The site comprises a Celtic fortification (Oppidum), and a fortified village dating from the Roman Empire. Petinesca was mentioned in the Tabula Peutingeriana and the Antonine Itinerary as a station on the road between Aventicum (Avenches) and Salodurum (Solothurn). The Roman site dates from around the middle of the 1st century AD, however the Celtic Oppidum is probably older. The temple complex was in operation from the 1st century until the middle of the 4th century and consisted of six temples, three chapels, an unknown building and a well. Outside the temple complex, additional temples, houses, buildings and graves from the 1st to 4th centuries have been discovered. A small military base, built in 368–69, in the nearby municipality of Aegerten many have been connected to Petinesca.

=== Studen ===
During the Middle Ages, the village of Studen and many surrounding villages were owned by the Counts of Neuchâtel-Nidau. In 1398 the entire Inselgau, including Studen, was acquired by the city of Bern and incorporated into the bailiwick of Nidau and the parish of Bürglen. Throughout its history, the village and its surrounding fields were occasionally damaged or destroyed when the Aare river flooded. The Jura water correction projects of 1868 to 1891 rerouted the Aare, prevented flooding and opened up additional farm land. However, as the town grew and industrialized, agriculture became less important and today less than 3% of jobs in the municipality are in farming. Beginning in the 1950s the nearby city of Biel grew into an industrial center and converted Studen into an industrial town. Despite the growth of industry, Studen was first connected to the Swiss Federal Railways network in 1999. As the population grew, new infrastructure was built including a primary school in 1968 and secondary schools in 1973 and 1983 and a parish church. Even with the new development the Petinesca and old Aare river course areas have remained undeveloped.

== Geography ==
Studen has an area of 2.73 km^{2} (1.05 sq mi). As of 2012, a total of 1.05 km^{2} (0.41 mi^{2}) or 38.6% is used for agricultural purposes, while 0.49 km^{2} (0.19 mi^{2}) or 18.0% is forested. The rest of the municipality is 1.14 km^{2} (0.44 mi^{2}) or 41.9% is settled (buildings or roads), 0.02 km^{2} (4.9 acres) or 0.7% is either rivers or lakes.

During the same year, industrial buildings made up 10.3% of the total area while housing and buildings made up 18.4% and transportation infrastructure made up 6.6%. Power and water infrastructure as well as other special developed areas made up 4.8% of the area while parks, green belts and sports fields made up 1.8%. A total of 16.5% of the total land area is heavily forested and 1.5% is covered with orchards or small clusters of trees. Of the agricultural land, 29.8% is used for growing crops and 5.1% is pasturage, while 3.7% is used for orchards or vine crops. All the water in the municipality is flowing water.

The municipality is located along the old Aare riverbed and on the slopes of the Jensberg.

On 31 December 2009 Amtsbezirk Nidau, the municipality's former district, was dissolved. On the following day, 1 January 2010, it joined the newly created Verwaltungskreis Seeland.

== Coat of arms ==
The blazon of the municipal coat of arms is Or a Fir Tree issuant from a Willow Vert trunked and eradicated Gules.

== Demographics ==
Studen has a population (as of December 2020) of 3,372. As of 2010, 12.8% of the population are resident foreign nationals. Over the last 10 years (2001–2011) the population has changed at a rate of 0.5%. Migration accounted for 0.5%, while births and deaths accounted for 0.4%.

Most of the population (as of 2000) speaks German (2,140 or 89.7%) as their first language, French is the second most common (85 or 3.6%) and Italian is the third (36 or 1.5%). There are 2 people who speak Romansh.

As of 2008, the population was 48.3% male and 51.7% female. The population was made up of 1,164 Swiss men (41.3% of the population) and 197 (7.0%) non-Swiss men. There were 1,295 Swiss women (45.9%) and 164 (5.8%) non-Swiss women. Of the population in the municipality, 428 or about 17.9% were born in Studen and lived there in 2000. There were 1,185 or 49.6% who were born in the same canton, while 370 or 15.5% were born somewhere else in Switzerland, and 322 or 13.5% were born outside of Switzerland.

As of 2011, children and teenagers (0–19 years old) make up 21.4% of the population, while adults (20–64 years old) make up 64% and seniors (over 64 years old) make up 14.6%.

As of 2000, there were 947 people who were single and never married in the municipality. There were 1,180 married individuals, 86 widows or widowers and 174 individuals who are divorced.

As of 2010, there were 392 households that consist of only one person and 60 households with five or more people. In 2000, a total of 1,004 apartments (92.8% of the total) were permanently occupied, while 49 apartments (4.5%) were seasonally occupied and 29 apartments (2.7%) were empty. As of 2010, the construction rate of new housing units was 20.2 new units per 1000 residents. The vacancy rate for the municipality, in 2012, was 2.98%. In 2011, single family homes made up 60.6% of the total housing in the municipality.

The historical population is given in the following chart:

== Heritage sites of national significance ==
The Roman era vicus and temple complex at Petinesca is listed as a Swiss heritage site of national significance.

== Politics ==
In the 2011 federal election the most popular party was the Swiss People's Party (SVP) which received 37.9% of the vote. The next three most popular parties were the Conservative Democratic Party (BDP) (19.3%), the Social Democratic Party (SP) (14%) and the FDP.The Liberals (8.3%). In the federal election, a total of 857 votes were cast, and the voter turnout was 42.3%.

== Economy ==
As of 2011, Studen had an unemployment rate of 2.44%. As of 2008, there were a total of 1,439 people employed in the municipality. Of these, there were 32 people employed in the primary economic sector and about 5 businesses involved in this sector. 498 people were employed in the secondary sector and there were 41 businesses in this sector. 909 people were employed in the tertiary sector, with 85 businesses in this sector. There were 1,403 residents of the municipality who were employed in some capacity, of which females made up 45.8% of the workforce.

In 2008 there were a total of 1,255 full-time equivalent jobs. The number of jobs in the primary sector was 22, all of which were in agriculture. The number of jobs in the secondary sector was 471 of which 275 or (58.4%) were in manufacturing, 1 was in mining and 193 (41.0%) were in construction. The number of jobs in the tertiary sector was 762. In the tertiary sector; 425 or 55.8% were in wholesale or retail sales or the repair of motor vehicles, 70 or 9.2% were in the movement and storage of goods, 68 or 8.9% were in a hotel or restaurant, 44 or 5.8% were the insurance or financial industry, 18 or 2.4% were technical professionals or scientists, 34 or 4.5% were in education and 48 or 6.3% were in health care.

In 2000, there were 798 workers who commuted into the municipality and 1,069 workers who commuted away. The municipality is a net exporter of workers, with about 1.3 workers leaving the municipality for every one entering. A total of 334 workers (29.5% of the 1,132 total workers in the municipality) both lived and worked in Studen. Of the working population, 19.7% used public transportation to get to work, and 56% used a private car.

In 2011 the average local and cantonal tax rate on a married resident, with two children, of Studen making 150,000 CHF was 12%, while an unmarried resident's rate was 17.6%. For comparison, the average rate for the entire canton in the same year, was 14.2% and 22.0%, while the nationwide average was 12.3% and 21.1% respectively. In 2009 there were a total of 1,286 tax payers in the municipality. Of that total, 469 made over 75,000 CHF per year. There were 15 people who made between 15,000 and 20,000 per year. The average income of the over 75,000 CHF group in Studen was 110,996 CHF, while the average across all of Switzerland was 130,478 CHF.

In 2011 a total of 5.0% of the population received direct financial assistance from the government.

== Religion ==
From the 2000 census, 1,563 or 65.5% belonged to the Swiss Reformed Church, while 366 or 15.3% were Roman Catholic. Of the rest of the population, there were 35 members of an Orthodox church (or about 1.47% of the population), and there were 63 individuals (or about 2.64% of the population) who belonged to another Christian church. There were 60 (or about 2.51% of the population) who were Islamic. There were 5 individuals who were Buddhist, 12 individuals who were Hindu and 2 individuals who belonged to another church. 195 (or about 8.17% of the population) belonged to no church, are agnostic or atheist, and 86 individuals (or about 3.60% of the population) did not answer the question.

== Education ==
In Studen about 60.9% of the population have completed non-mandatory upper secondary education, and 14.5% have completed additional higher education (either university or a Fachhochschule). Of the 237 who had completed some form of tertiary schooling listed in the census, 70.5% were Swiss men, 18.6% were Swiss women, 7.6% were non-Swiss men and 3.4% were non-Swiss women.

The Canton of Bern school system provides one year of non-obligatory Kindergarten, followed by six years of Primary school. This is followed by three years of obligatory lower Secondary school where the students are separated according to ability and aptitude. Following the lower Secondary students may attend additional schooling or they may enter an apprenticeship.

During the 2011–12 school year, there were a total of 383 students attending classes in Studen. There were 3 kindergarten classes with a total of 49 students in the municipality. Of the kindergarten students, 10.2% were permanent or temporary residents of Switzerland (not citizens) and 30.6% have a different mother language than the classroom language. The municipality had 10 primary classes and 174 students. Of the primary students, 17.2% were permanent or temporary residents of Switzerland (not citizens) and 25.9% have a different mother language than the classroom language. During the same year, there were 10 lower secondary classes with a total of 160 students. There were 14.4% who were permanent or temporary residents of Switzerland (not citizens) and 16.3% have a different mother language than the classroom language.

As of 2000, there were a total of 353 students attending any school in the municipality. Of those, 264 both lived and attended school in the municipality, while 89 students came from another municipality. During the same year, 72 residents attended schools outside the municipality.
