= Jens, Switzerland =

Jens
- Municipality
- Flag Coat of arms
- Location of Jens
- Location within Switzerland Location within Canton of Bern
- Coordinates: 47°6′N 7°16′E
- Country: Switzerland
- Canton: Bern
- District: Seeland

Area
  - Total: 4.6 km^{2} (1.8 sq mi)
- Elevation: 437 m (1,434 ft)

Population (Dec 2011)
  - Total: 667
  - Density: 140/km^{2} (380/sq mi)
- Time zone: UTC+01:00 (CET)
  - Summer (DST): UTC+02:00 (CEST)
- Postal code: 2565
- SFOS number: 738
- ISO 3166 code: CH-BE
- Surrounded by: Aegerten, Bellmund, Kappelen, Merzligen, Port, Studen, Worben
- Website: www.jens.ch

Jens is a municipality in the Seeland administrative district in the canton of Bern in Switzerland.

== History ==
Jens is first mentioned in 1229-30 as Gens. In 1335 it was mentioned as Jensse.

The village was originally part of the Herrschaft of Nidau. In 1335, the owner of the Herrschaft, the Knight Ulrich von Sutz, sold his land to the Counts of Neuchâtel-Nidau. The Counts held the land until 1398 when it was acquired by the city of Bern. Under Bernese rule Jens became part of the Bailiwick of Nidau. Jens and Worben formed a court in the Bailiwick and it was part of the parish of Bürglen. During the Jura water correction projects of 1868-91, a canal was built in Jens and the nearby marsh was drained. The majority of the new farmland was planted with sugar beets for the sugar beet factory in Aarberg. As the population grew, the housing developments of Tannacker and Weieried were built in the late 1970s. Today about two-thirds of the workers commute to jobs outside the municipality.

== Geography ==
Jens has an area of 4.58 km^{2} (1.77 sq mi). As of 2012, a total of 3.2 km^{2} (1.2 mi^{2}) or 69.9% is used for agricultural purposes, while 1.05 km^{2} (0.41 mi^{2}) or 22.9% is forested. Of the rest of the land, 0.34 km^{2} (0.13 mi^{2}) or 7.4% is settled (buildings or roads), 0.01 km^{2} (2.5 acres) or 0.2% is either rivers or lakes.

During the same year, housing and buildings made up 4.8% and transportation infrastructure made up 2.6%. Out of the forested land, 20.1% of the total land area is heavily forested and 2.8% is covered with orchards or small clusters of trees. Of the agricultural land, 58.3% is used for growing crops and 10.0% is pastures, while 1.5% is used for orchards or vine crops. All the water in the municipality is flowing water.

The municipality is located on the southern slope of the Jensberg.

On 31 December 2009 Amtsbezirk Nidau, the municipality's former district, was dissolved. On the following day, 1 January 2010, it joined the newly created Verwaltungskreis Seeland.

== Coat of arms ==
The blazon of the municipal coat of arms is Gules a Rose Argent barbed and seeded proper and a Bar of the second.

== Demographics ==
Jens has a population (as of December 2020) of 633. As of 2010, 3.0% of the population are resident foreign nationals. Over the last 10 years (2001-2011) the population has changed at a rate of -1.2%. Migration accounted for -0.6%, while births and deaths accounted for 0.3%.

Most of the population (as of 2000) speaks German (585 or 96.1%) as their first language, French is the second most common (13 or 2.1%) and English is the third (4 or 0.7%). There is 1 person who speaks Italian and 1 person who speaks Romansh.

As of 2008, the population was 50.2% male and 49.8% female. The population was made up of 329 Swiss men (48.7% of the population) and 10 (1.5%) non-Swiss men. There were 326 Swiss women (48.3%) and 1 (0.1%) non-Swiss women. Of the population in the municipality, 199 or about 32.7% were born in Jens and lived there in 2000. There were 261 or 42.9% who were born in the same canton, while 105 or 17.2% were born somewhere else in Switzerland, and 26 or 4.3% were born outside of Switzerland.

As of 2011, children and teenagers (0–19 years old) make up 21.9% of the population, while adults (20–64 years old) make up 60.6% and seniors (over 64 years old) make up 17.5%.

As of 2000, there were 229 people who were single and never married in the municipality. There were 337 married individuals, 29 widows or widowers and 14 individuals who are divorced.

As of 2010, there were 52 households that consist of only one person and 22 households with five or more people. In 2000, a total of 226 apartments (91.5% of the total) were permanently occupied, while 15 apartments (6.1%) were seasonally occupied and 6 apartments (2.4%) were empty. As of 2010, the construction rate of new housing units was 3 new units per 1000 residents. The vacancy rate for the municipality, in 2012, was 1.06%. In 2011, single family homes made up 68.6% of the total housing in the municipality.

The historical population is given in the following chart:

== Politics ==
In the 2011 federal election the most popular party was the Swiss People's Party (SVP) which received 30.6% of the vote. The next three most popular parties were the Conservative Democratic Party (BDP) (20.6%), the Social Democratic Party (SP) (19.6%) and the Green Party (6.4%). In the federal election, a total of 307 votes were cast, and the voter turnout was 58.3%.

== Economy ==
As of 2011, Jens had an unemployment rate of 0.82%. As of 2008, there were a total of 97 people employed in the municipality. Of these, there were 43 people employed in the primary economic sector and about 15 businesses involved in this sector. 24 people were employed in the secondary sector and there were 5 businesses in this sector. 30 people were employed in the tertiary sector, with 12 businesses in this sector. There were 329 residents of the municipality who were employed in some capacity, of which females made up 43.8% of the workforce.

In 2008 there were a total of 71 full-time equivalent jobs. The number of jobs in the primary sector was 25, all of which were in agriculture. The number of jobs in the secondary sector was 23 of which 12 or (52.2%) were in manufacturing and 10 (43.5%) were in construction. The number of jobs in the tertiary sector was 23. In the tertiary sector; 7 or 30.4% were in wholesale or retail sales or the repair of motor vehicles, 3 or 13.0% were in a hotel or restaurant, 2 or 8.7% were the insurance or financial industry, 1 was a technical professional or scientist, 4 or 17.4% were in education.

In 2000, there were 24 workers who commuted into the municipality and 245 workers who commuted away. The municipality is a net exporter of workers, with about 10.2 workers leaving the municipality for every one entering. A total of 84 workers (77.8% of the 108 total workers in the municipality) both lived and worked in Jens. Of the working population, 11.2% used public transportation to get to work, and 59.9% used a private car.

In 2011 the average local and cantonal tax rate on a married resident, with two children, of Jens making 150,000 CHF was 12.9%, while an unmarried resident's rate was 19%. For comparison, the rate for the entire canton in the same year, was 14.2% and 22.0%, while the nationwide rate was 12.3% and 21.1% respectively. In 2009 there were a total of 285 tax payers in the municipality. Of that total, 126 made over 75,000 CHF per year. There were 5 people who made between 15,000 and 20,000 per year. The average income of the over 75,000 CHF group in Jens was 120,112 CHF, while the average across all of Switzerland was 130,478 CHF.

In 2011 a total of 0.9% of the population received direct financial assistance from the government.

== Religion ==
From the 2000 census, 457 or 75.0% belonged to the Swiss Reformed Church, while 55 or 9.0% were Roman Catholic. Of the rest of the population, there were 4 individuals (or about 0.66% of the population) who belonged to the Christian Catholic Church, and there were 16 individuals (or about 2.63% of the population) who belonged to another Christian church. There were 5 (or about 0.82% of the population) who were Islamic. There were 4 individuals who were Buddhist and 1 person who was Hindu. 51 (or about 8.37% of the population) belonged to no church, are agnostic or atheist, and 16 individuals (or about 2.63% of the population) did not answer the question.

== Education ==
In Jens about 57.7% of the population have completed non-mandatory upper secondary education, and 25.1% have completed additional higher education (either university or a Fachhochschule). Of the 101 who had completed some form of tertiary schooling listed in the census, 81.2% were Swiss men, 18.8% were Swiss women.

The Canton of Bern school system provides one year of non-obligatory Kindergarten, followed by six years of Primary school. This is followed by three years of obligatory lower Secondary school where the students are separated according to ability and aptitude. Following the lower Secondary students may attend additional schooling or they may enter an apprenticeship.

During the 2011-12 school year, there were a total of 48 students attending classes in Jens. There was one kindergarten class with a total of 15 students in the municipality. Of the kindergarten students, 13.3% have a different mother language than the classroom language. The municipality had 2 primary classes and 33 students.

As of 2000, there were a total of 48 students living in and attending any school in the municipality. 45 students from Jens attended schools outside the municipality.
