= Aegerten =

- Municipality
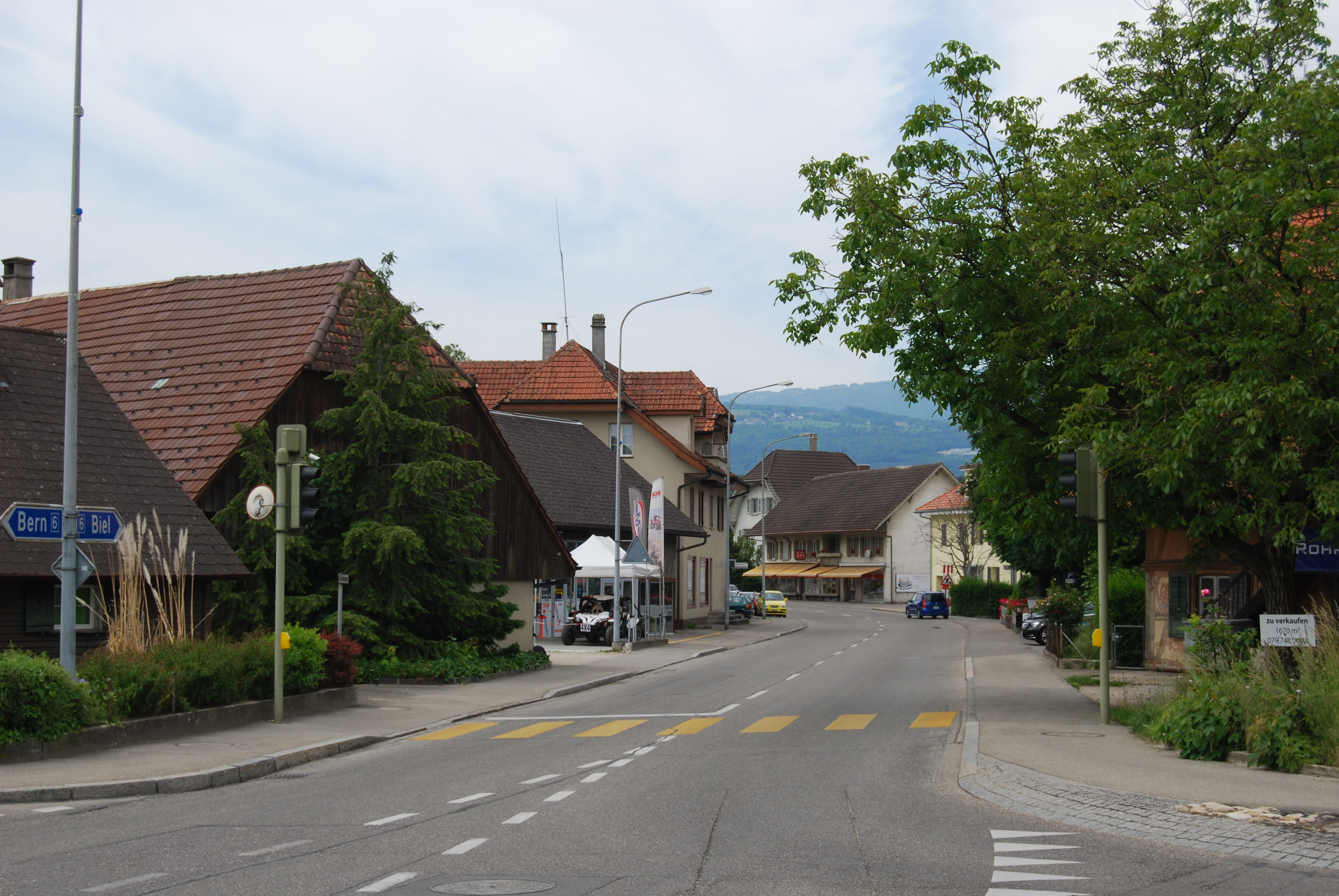

- Flag Coat of arms
- Location of Aegerten
- Location within Switzerland Location within Canton of Bern
- Coordinates: 47°7′N 7°17′E
- Country: Switzerland
- Canton: Bern
- District: Biel/Bienne

Government
  - Executive: Gemeinderat with 6 (Note: The Secretary of the Council is also a part of the Gemeinderat.) members
  - Mayor: Gemeindepräsident; Christine Rawyler (as of 2026)

Area
  - Total: 2.1 km^{2} (0.81 sq mi)
- Elevation: 437 m (1,434 ft)

Population (2020)
  - Total: 2,210
  - Density: 1,100/km^{2} (2,700/sq mi)
- Time zone: UTC+01:00 (CET)
  - Summer (DST): UTC+02:00 (CEST)
- Postal code: 2558
- SFOS number: 731
- ISO 3166 code: CH-BE
- Surrounded by: Studen, Jens, Port, Brügg, Schwadernau
- Website: www.aegerten.ch

Aegerten is a municipality in the Biel/Bienne administrative district of the canton of Bern in Switzerland.

== History ==
Aegerten is first mentioned in 1225 as villa Egerdon.

There has been a village here since at least the late-Roman era. It lay on the major Roman road from Aventicum to Petinesca over the Pierre-Pertuis pass to Basel. A bridge was built across Zihl river by 368–69. The ruins of the bridge have been discovered beneath the Bürglen village church and on the banks of the Flur island in the river. Very little is known about the village after the collapse of the Roman Empire until the Late Middle Ages. By the late medieval era, Gottstatt Abbey was the major landholder in the village. In 1388, the city of Bern acquired the village and in 1393 incorporated it into the Nidau bailiwick and the Bürglen parish. Aegerten remained a small, agrarian village until the 18th century, when shipping on the Zihl river and seasonal work in the Principality of Neuchâtel began to provide additional income. Despite four bridges, the village remained isolated from the growing Swiss rail and road networks in the 19th and early 20th century. As the nearby town of Biel grew in the 1950s, Aegerten finally began to develop into a commuter town and was connected into the Swiss Federal Railways network.

== Geography ==
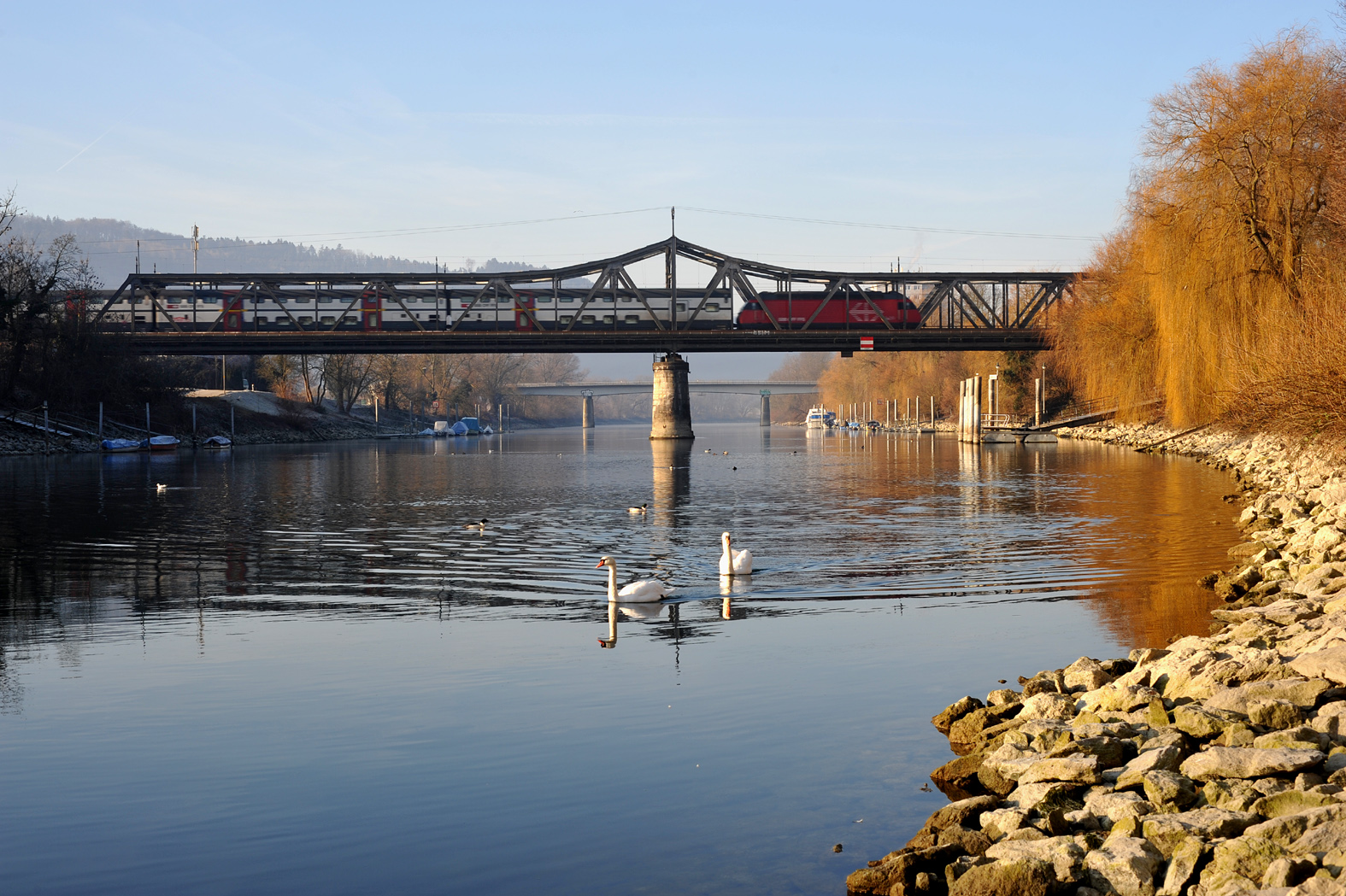
Railroad bridge over the Zihl river

Aegerten has an area of 2.16 km^{2} (0.83 sq mi). As of 2012, a total of 0.81 km^{2} (0.31 mi^{2}) or 37.3% is used for agricultural purposes, while 0.61 km^{2} (0.24 mi^{2}) or 28.1% is forested. Of the rest of the land, 0.63 km^{2} (0.24 mi^{2}) or 29.0% is settled (buildings or roads), 0.11 km^{2} (27 acres) or 5.1% is either rivers or lakes.

During the same year, industrial buildings made up 2.8% of the total area while housing and buildings made up 15.2% and transportation infrastructure made up 5.5%. Power and water infrastructure as well as other special developed areas made up 1.4% of the area while parks, green belts and sports fields made up 4.1%. Out of the forested land, 26.7% of the total land area is heavily forested and 1.4% is covered with orchards or small clusters of trees. Of the agricultural land, 25.3% is used for growing crops and 9.2% is pastures, while 2.8% is used for orchards or vine crops. All the water in the municipality is flowing water.

The municipality is located on the right bank of the Nidau-Büren Canal. The municipality has grown together with Brügg and Studen. It consists of the villages of Aegerten and Bürglen along with the new housing developments of Tschannenmatte and Schüracher.

On 31 December 2009 Amtsbezirk Nidau, the municipality's former district, was dissolved. On the following day, 1 January 2010, it joined the newly created Verwaltungskreis Biel/Bienne.

== Coat of arms ==
The blazon of the municipal coat of arms is Or a Lion rampant Sable langued and membered Gules and overall a Bendlet wavy Azure.

== Demographics ==
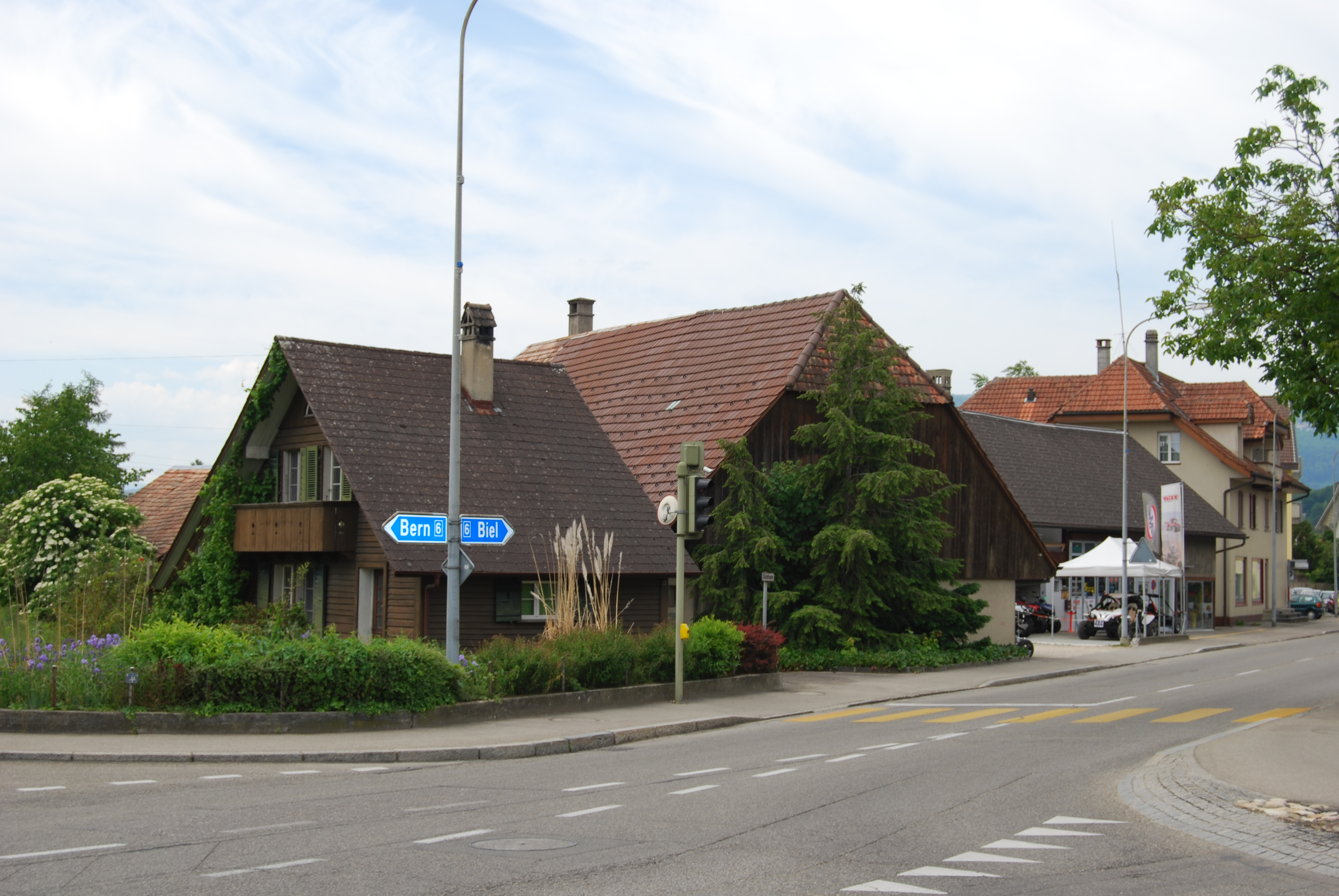
Houses in Aegerten

Aegerten has a population (as of December 2020) of 2,210. As of 2010, 13.8% of the population are resident foreign nationals. Over the last 10 years (2001-2011) the population has changed at a rate of -0.1%. Migration accounted for -0.4%, while births and deaths accounted for 0.6%.

Most of the population (as of 2000) speaks German (1,512 or 90.9%) as their first language, French is the second most common (70 or 4.2%) and Italian is the third (22 or 1.3%).

As of 2008, the population was 49.9% male and 50.1% female. The population was made up of 735 Swiss men (42.5% of the population) and 128 (7.4%) non-Swiss men. There were 757 Swiss women (43.8%) and 11 (0.6%) non-Swiss women. Of the population in the municipality, 327 or about 19.7% were born in Aegerten and lived there in 2000. There were 815 or 49.0% who were born in the same canton, while 298 or 17.9% were born somewhere else in Switzerland, and 174 or 10.5% were born outside of Switzerland.

As of 2011, children and teenagers (0–19 years old) make up 18.4% of the population, while adults (20–64 years old) make up 60.4% and seniors (over 64 years old) make up 21.2%.

As of 2000, there were 606 people who were single and never married in the municipality. There were 908 married individuals, 72 widows or widowers and 77 individuals who are divorced.

As of 2010, there were 263 households that consist of only one person and 37 households with five or more people. In 2000, a total of 684 apartments (90.1% of the total) were permanently occupied, while 32 apartments (4.2%) were seasonally occupied and 43 apartments (5.7%) were empty. As of 2010, the construction rate of new housing units was 5.8 new units per 1000 residents. The vacancy rate for the municipality, in 2012, was 3.9%. In 2011, single family homes made up 72.3% of the total housing in the municipality.

The historical population is given in the following chart:

== Heritage sites of national significance ==
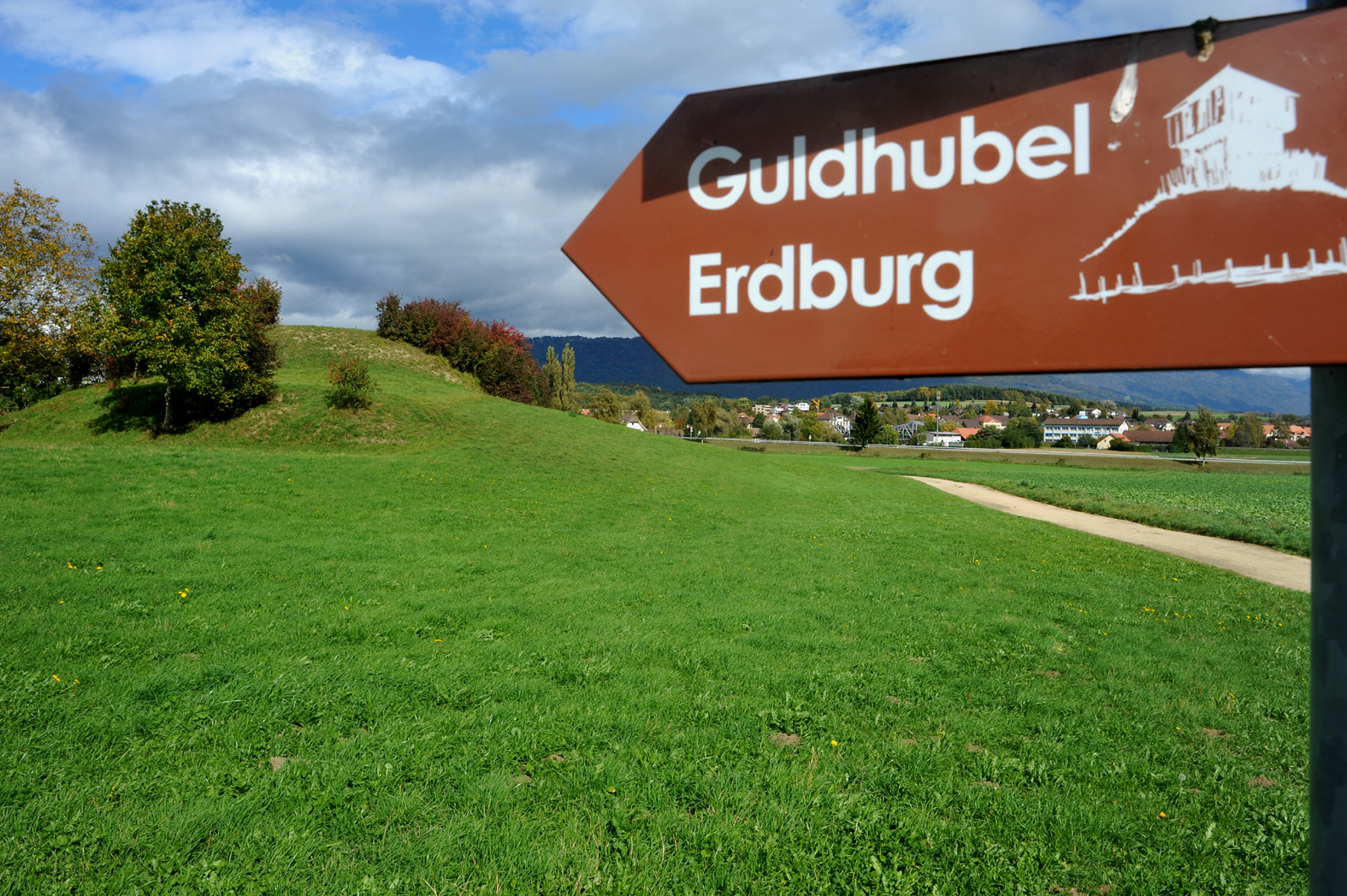
View of Goldhubel hill and a representation of the fort

The Goldhubel, an early medieval earthen fortress, is listed as a Swiss heritage site of national significance.

== Politics ==
In the 2011 federal election the most popular party was the Swiss People's Party (SVP) which received 31.4% of the vote. The next three most popular parties were the Social Democratic Party (SP) (23.9%), the Conservative Democratic Party (BDP) (18.5%) and the FDP.The Liberals (7.9%). In the federal election, a total of 586 votes were cast, and the voter turnout was 45.7%.

== Economy ==
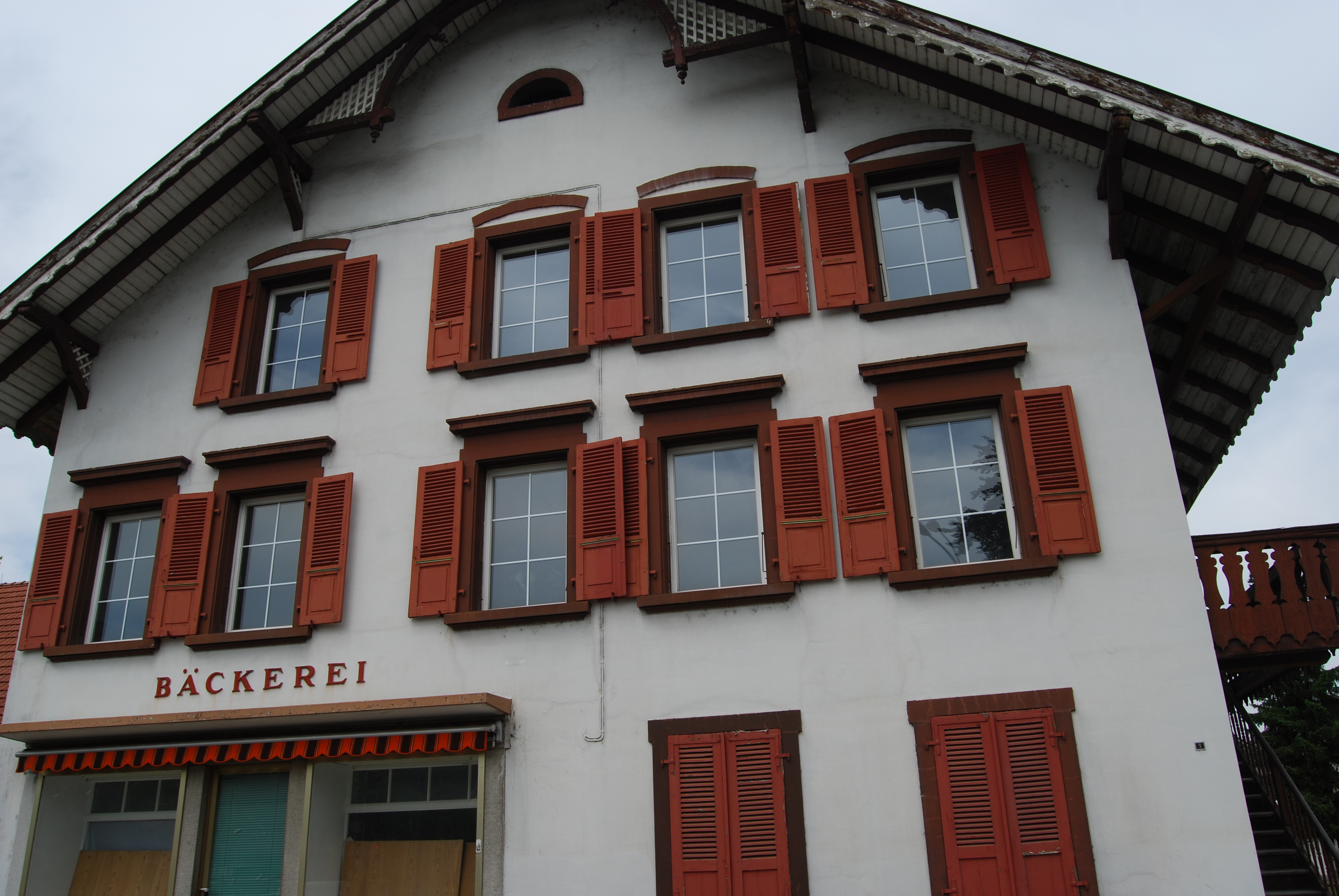
Bakery in Aegerten

As of 2011, Aegerten had an unemployment rate of 2.54%. As of 2008, there were a total of 386 people employed in the municipality. Of these, there were 17 people employed in the primary economic sector and about 3 businesses involved in this sector. 198 people were employed in the secondary sector and there were 22 businesses in this sector. 171 people were employed in the tertiary sector, with 42 businesses in this sector. There were 930 residents of the municipality who were employed in some capacity, of which females made up 43.2% of the workforce.

In 2008 there were a total of 324 full-time equivalent jobs. The number of jobs in the primary sector was 8, all of which were in agriculture. The number of jobs in the secondary sector was 183 of which 159 or (86.9%) were in manufacturing and 24 (13.1%) were in construction. The number of jobs in the tertiary sector was 133. In the tertiary sector; 32 or 24.1% were in wholesale or retail sales or the repair of motor vehicles, 12 or 9.0% were in the movement and storage of goods, 18 or 13.5% were in a hotel or restaurant, 5 or 3.8% were in the information industry, 10 or 7.5% were technical professionals or scientists, 11 or 8.3% were in education and 9 or 6.8% were in health care.

In 2000, there were 263 workers who commuted into the municipality and 765 workers who commuted away. The municipality is a net exporter of workers, with about 2.9 workers leaving the municipality for every one entering. A total of 165 workers (38.6% of the 428 total workers in the municipality) both lived and worked in Aegerten. Of the working population, 18.2% used public transportation to get to work, and 57.4% used a private car.

In 2011 the average local and cantonal tax rate on a married resident, with two children, of Aegerten making 150,000 CHF was 12.6%, while an unmarried resident's rate was 18.5%. For comparison, the rate for the entire canton in the same year, was 14.2% and 22.0%, while the nationwide rate was 12.3% and 21.1% respectively. In 2009 there were a total of 815 tax payers in the municipality. Of that total, 250 made over 75,000 CHF per year. There were 6 people who made between 15,000 and 20,000 per year. The average income of the over 75,000 CHF group in Aegerten was 109,064 CHF, while the average across all of Switzerland was 130,478 CHF.

In 2011 a total of 5.7% of the population received direct financial assistance from the government.

== Religion ==
From the 2000 census, 1,119 or 67.3% belonged to the Swiss Reformed Church, while 254 or 15.3% were Roman Catholic. Of the rest of the population, there were 19 members of an Orthodox church (or about 1.14% of the population), there was 1 individual who belongs to the Christian Catholic Church, and there were 37 individuals (or about 2.22% of the population) who belonged to another Christian church. There was 1 individual who was Jewish, and 36 (or about 2.16% of the population) who were Islamic. There were 2 individuals who were Buddhist, 5 individuals who were Hindu and 1 individual who belonged to another church. 140 (or about 8.42% of the population) belonged to no church, are agnostic or atheist, and 48 individuals (or about 2.89% of the population) did not answer the question.

== Education ==
In Aegerten about 63.3% of the population have completed non-mandatory upper secondary education, and 16.3% have completed additional higher education (either university or a Fachhochschule). Of the 183 who had completed some form of tertiary schooling listed in the census, 78.1% were Swiss men, 18.0% were Swiss women, 2.7% were non-Swiss men.

The Canton of Bern school system provides one year of non-obligatory Kindergarten, followed by six years of Primary school. This is followed by three years of obligatory lower Secondary school where the students are separated according to ability and aptitude. Following the lower Secondary students may attend additional schooling or they may enter an apprenticeship.

During the 2011–12 school year, there were a total of 122 students attending classes in Aegerten. There were 2 kindergarten classes with a total of 27 students in the municipality. Of the kindergarten students, 25.9% were permanent or temporary residents of Switzerland (not citizens) and 40.7% have a different mother language than the classroom language. The municipality had 5 primary classes and 95 students. Of the primary students, 17.9% were permanent or temporary residents of Switzerland (not citizens) and 25.3% have a different mother language than the classroom language.

As of 2000, there were a total of 129 students attending any school in the municipality. Of those, 121 both lived and attended school in the municipality, while 8 students came from another municipality. During the same year, 120 residents attended schools outside the municipality.
