= Worben =

- Municipality
- Flag Coat of arms
- Location of Worben
- Location within Switzerland Location within Canton of Bern
- Coordinates: 47°6′N 7°17′E
- Country: Switzerland
- Canton: Bern
- District: Seeland

Area
  - Total: 2.8 km^{2} (1.1 sq mi)
- Elevation: 438 m (1,437 ft)

Population (Dec 2011)
  - Total: 2,283
  - Density: 820/km^{2} (2,100/sq mi)
- Time zone: UTC+01:00 (CET)
  - Summer (DST): UTC+02:00 (CEST)
- Postal code: 3252
- SFOS number: 755
- ISO 3166 code: CH-BE
- Surrounded by: Busswil bei Büren, Jens, Kappelen, Lyss, Studen
- Website: www.worben.ch

Worben is a municipality in the Seeland administrative district in the canton of Bern in Switzerland.

== History ==
Worben is first mentioned in 1228 as apud Worbun.

The oldest trace of a settlement in the area is a single Neolithic artifact discovered during construction of the Binnen Canal. Part of the Roman era station of Petinesca is located in the modern municipal borders, as well as a Roman road. During the Middle Ages the two villages of Oberworben and Unterworben were ruled by the Counts of Neuchâtel-Nidau. The monasteries at Gottstatt and Frienisberg owned most of the land in the villages. In 1398 the entire Neuchâtel-Nidau district of Inselgau, including Worben, was acquired by the city of Bern. While the two villages had their own fields, they were always administered as a single municipality. In 1463, the hamlet of Worbenbad was mentioned as part of the municipality. In 1783, all three settlements had a total of 26 houses. Both villages were periodically flooded by the Aare river. The Jura water correction projects of 1868-91 finally ended the flood risk. A bridge replaced a ferry on the Lyss road in 1886-87. In 1890 the Seeland Baumschulen company opened a nursery in the municipality. Worben was part of the parish of Bürglen until 1952 when it became the center of the Worben parish. In the 1960s the population of Worben grew as the surrounding towns of Biel, Lyss, Bern and Aarberg grew into industrial centers. A number of new houses, schools and sport facilities were built for the growing population. In 1991 a regional group home and workshop for the disabled opened. In Worbenbad, a home for the poor opened in 1876. It later became a regional nursing home and in 2011 had about 400 residents.

== Geography ==
Worben has an area of 2.76 km^{2} (1.07 sq mi). As of 2012, a total of 1.74 km^{2} (0.67 mi^{2}) or 62.1% is used for agricultural purposes, while 0.21 km^{2} (0.081 mi^{2}) or 7.5% is forested. The rest of the municipality is 0.82 km^{2} (0.32 mi^{2}) or 29.3% is settled (buildings or roads), 0.02 km^{2} (4.9 acres) or 0.7% is either rivers or lakes.

During the same year, industrial buildings made up 2.5% of the total area while housing and buildings made up 18.6% and transportation infrastructure made up 5.4%. while parks, green belts and sports fields made up 2.1%. A total of 6.4% of the total land area is heavily forested and 1.1% is covered with orchards or small clusters of trees. Of the agricultural land, 47.5% is used for growing crops and 10.4% is pasturage, while 4.3% is used for orchards or vine crops. All the water in the municipality is in lakes.

The municipality is located on the northern end of the Grosses Moos between Jensberg mountain and the old Aare riverbed.

On 31 December 2009 Amtsbezirk Nidau, the municipality's former district, was dissolved. On the following day, 1 January 2010, it joined the newly created Verwaltungskreis Seeland.

== Coat of arms ==
The blazon of the municipal coat of arms is Azure a Garb Or with three Panicles Sable.

== Demographics ==
Worben has a population (as of December 2020) of 2,404. As of 2010, 8.9% of the population are resident foreign nationals. Over the last 10 years (2001-2011) the population has changed at a rate of 1%. Migration accounted for 0.9%, while births and deaths accounted for 0.4%. Most of the population (as of 2000) speaks German (2,010 or 91.4%) as their first language, French is the second most common (53 or 2.4%) and Turkish is the third (39 or 1.8%). There are 18 people who speak Italian and 2 people who speak Romansh.

As of 2008, the population was 48.4% male and 51.6% female. The population was made up of 976 Swiss men (43.2% of the population) and 118 (5.2%) non-Swiss men. There were 1,083 Swiss women (47.9%) and 83 (3.7%) non-Swiss women. Of the population in the municipality, 391 or about 17.8% were born in Worben and lived there in 2000. There were 1,106 or 50.3% who were born in the same canton, while 398 or 18.1% were born somewhere else in Switzerland, and 240 or 10.9% were born outside of Switzerland.

As of 2011, children and teenagers (0–19 years old) make up 20.1% of the population, while adults (20–64 years old) make up 62.3% and seniors (over 64 years old) make up 17.6%.

As of 2000, there were 854 people who were single and never married in the municipality. There were 1,041 married individuals, 177 widows or widowers and 127 individuals who are divorced.

As of 2010, there were 264 households that consist of only one person and 39 households with five or more people. In 2000, a total of 757 apartments (89.5% of the total) were permanently occupied, while 44 apartments (5.2%) were seasonally occupied and 45 apartments (5.3%) were empty. As of 2010, the construction rate of new housing units was 4.4 new units per 1000 residents. The vacancy rate for the municipality, in 2012, was 4.99%. In 2011, single family homes made up 67.9% of the total housing in the municipality.

The historical population is given in the following chart:

== Politics ==
In the 2011 federal election the most popular party was the Swiss People's Party (SVP) which received 31.3% of the vote. The next three most popular parties were the Conservative Democratic Party (BDP) (22%), the Social Democratic Party (SP) (18.8%) and the FDP.The Liberals (6.8%). In the federal election, a total of 797 votes were cast, and the voter turnout was 46.9%.

== Economy ==
As of 2011, Worben had an unemployment rate of 1.78%. As of 2008, there were a total of 805 people employed in the municipality. Of these, there were 106 people employed in the primary economic sector and about 12 businesses involved in this sector. 143 people were employed in the secondary sector and there were 14 businesses in this sector. 556 people were employed in the tertiary sector, with 42 businesses in this sector. There were 1,063 residents of the municipality who were employed in some capacity, of which females made up 45.4% of the workforce.

In 2008 there were a total of 611 full-time equivalent jobs. The number of jobs in the primary sector was 44, all of which were in agriculture. The number of jobs in the secondary sector was 132 of which 82 or (62.1%) were in manufacturing and 14 (10.6%) were in construction. The number of jobs in the tertiary sector was 435. In the tertiary sector; 65 or 14.9% were in wholesale or retail sales or the repair of motor vehicles, 7 or 1.6% were in the movement and storage of goods, 42 or 9.7% were in a hotel or restaurant, 6 or 1.4% were the insurance or financial industry, 10 or 2.3% were technical professionals or scientists, 16 or 3.7% were in education and 258 or 59.3% were in health care.

In 2000, there were 593 workers who commuted into the municipality and 810 workers who commuted away. The municipality is a net exporter of workers, with about 1.4 workers leaving the municipality for every one entering. A total of 253 workers (29.9% of the 846 total workers in the municipality) both lived and worked in Worben. Of the working population, 14.1% used public transportation to get to work, and 60.5% used a private car.

In 2011 the average local and cantonal tax rate on a married resident, with two children, of Worben making 150,000 CHF was 12.6%, while an unmarried resident's rate was 18.6%. For comparison, the average rate for the entire canton in the same year, was 14.2% and 22.0%, while the nationwide average was 12.3% and 21.1% respectively. In 2009 there were a total of 1,017 tax payers in the municipality. Of that total, 388 made over 75,000 CHF per year. There were 6 people who made between 15,000 and 20,000 per year. The average income of the over 75,000 CHF group in Worben was 107,946 CHF, while the average across all of Switzerland was 130,478 CHF.

In 2011 a total of 3.3% of the population received direct financial assistance from the government.

== Religion ==
From the 2000 census, 1,518 or 69.0% belonged to the Swiss Reformed Church, while 310 or 14.1% were Roman Catholic. Of the rest of the population, there were 12 members of an Orthodox church (or about 0.55% of the population), there were 5 individuals (or about 0.23% of the population) who belonged to the Christian Catholic Church, and there were 71 individuals (or about 3.23% of the population) who belonged to another Christian church. There were 58 (or about 2.64% of the population) who were Islamic. There were 6 individuals who were Buddhist and 4 individuals who belonged to another church. 156 (or about 7.09% of the population) belonged to no church, are agnostic or atheist, and 59 individuals (or about 2.68% of the population) did not answer the question.

== Education ==
In Worben about 55.7% of the population have completed non-mandatory upper secondary education, and 17.4% have completed additional higher education (either university or a Fachhochschule). Of the 228 who had completed some form of tertiary schooling listed in the census, 74.1% were Swiss men, 17.1% were Swiss women, 3.9% were non-Swiss men and 4.8% were non-Swiss women.

The Canton of Bern school system provides one year of non-obligatory Kindergarten, followed by six years of Primary school. This is followed by three years of obligatory lower Secondary school where the students are separated according to ability and aptitude. Following the lower Secondary students may attend additional schooling or they may enter an apprenticeship.

During the 2011-12 school year, there were a total of 190 students attending classes in Worben. There were 2 kindergarten classes with a total of 41 students in the municipality. Of the kindergarten students, 9.8% were permanent or temporary residents of Switzerland (not citizens) and 12.2% have a different mother language than the classroom language. The municipality had 7 primary classes and 140 students. Of the primary students, 9.3% were permanent or temporary residents of Switzerland (not citizens) and 15.0% have a different mother language than the classroom language. During the same year, there was one lower secondary class with a total of 9 students. There were 11.1% who were permanent or temporary residents of Switzerland (not citizens) and 11.1% have a different mother language than the classroom language.

As of 2000, there were a total of 195 students attending any school in the municipality. Of those, 187 both lived and attended school in the municipality, while 8 students came from another municipality. During the same year, 99 residents attended schools outside the municipality.
