= Twann-Tüscherz =

- Municipality
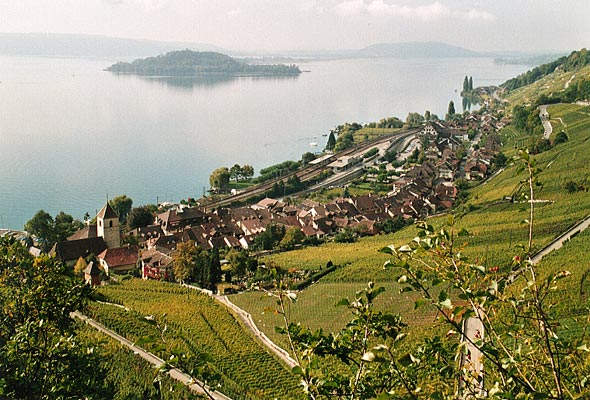
- Twann village with Lake Biel/Bienne and St. Peter's Island in background

- Flag Coat of arms
- Location of Twann-Tüscherz
- Location within Switzerland Location within Canton of Bern
- Coordinates: 47°6′N 7°11′E
- Country: Switzerland
- Canton: Bern
- District: Biel/Bienne

Government
  - Executive: Gemeinderat
  - Mayor: Gemeindepräsident; Bramwell Kaltenrieder (as of 2026)

Area
  - Total: 12.4 km^{2} (4.8 sq mi)
- Elevation: 434 m (1,424 ft)

Population (December 2020)
  - Total: 1,171
  - Density: 94.4/km^{2} (245/sq mi)
- Time zone: UTC+01:00 (CET)
  - Summer (DST): UTC+02:00 (CEST)
- Postal code: 2558
- SFOS number: 756
- ISO 3166 code: CH-BE
- Surrounded by: Biel/Bienne, Ipsach, Lamboing, Evilard, Nidau, Sutz-Lattrigen,
- Website: www.twann-tüscherz.ch

Twann-Tüscherz or Douanne-Daucher in French is a municipality in the Biel/Bienne administrative district in the canton of Bern in Switzerland. On 1 January 2010 the municipalities of Tüscherz-Alfermée and Twann merged into the municipality of Twann-Tüscherz.

== History ==
Aerial view (1954)

Twann is first mentioned in 1185 as Duana and again in 1225 as Tuanna. Tüscherz is first mentioned around 1230 as Tusschiers and in 1267 as Tuschers while Alfermée was first mentioned in 1276 Alphermme.

=== Twann ===
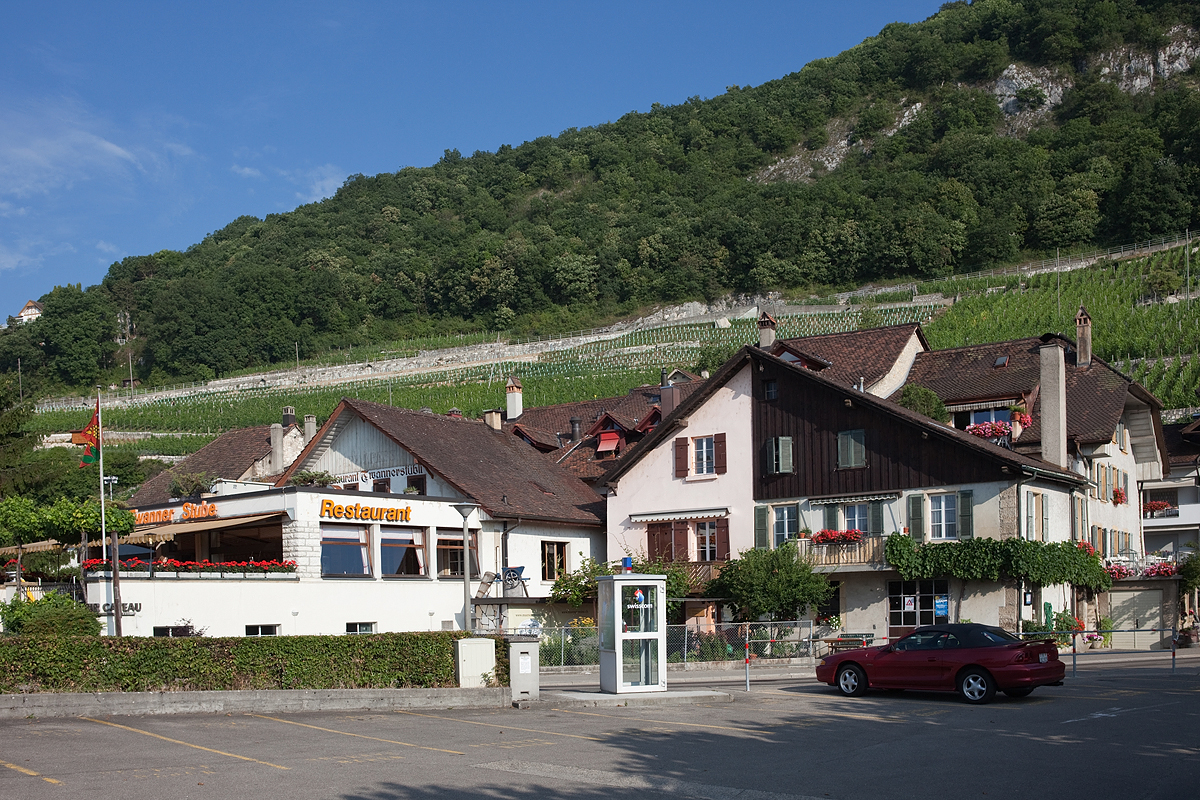
Twann village with vineyards on the hillside above it

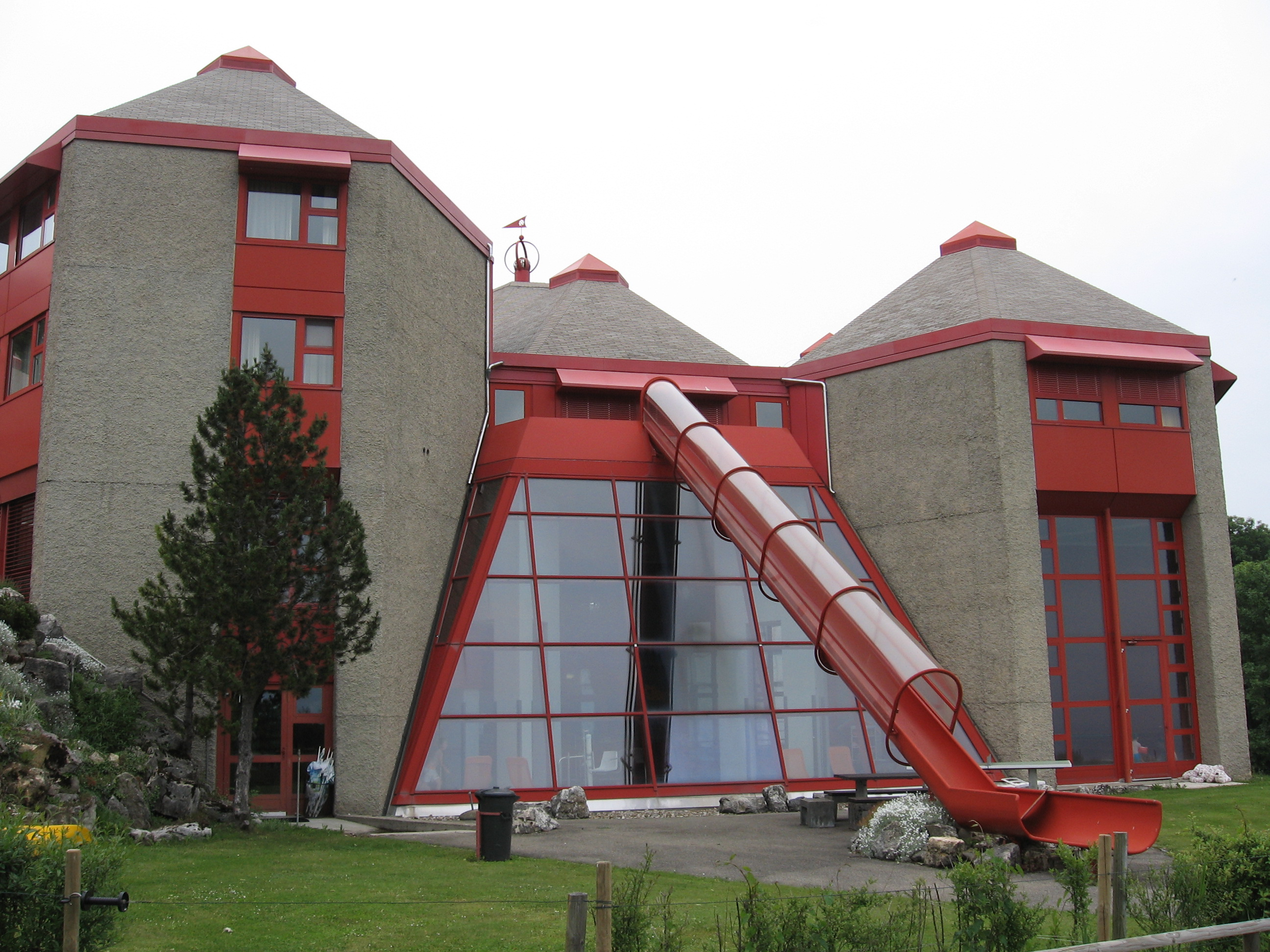
Twannberg vacation village and hotel was built in 1977-80

Just outside the Twann railway station is a large and well preserved Neolithic lakeside settlement. It was discovered in the mid 19th century and in 1974-76 about 10% of the total site was excavated. Almost 20 different village existed at the site between 3838 and 2976 BC. The longest a single village was inhabited was only 24 years. The small huts (7 m × 4 m [23 ft × 13 ft]) were only temporary and most had to be repaired after less than four years and replaced after sixteen. The huts stood in serried ranks either longitudinally or transversely oriented to the lake. The hut floors had a layer of peat to keep them dry and a clay hearth in the center. The residents used hoes, sticks and simple plows to raise grain which was eaten as a porridge or bread. They raised domestic cattle, sheep and goats constantly and hunted animals, mostly red deer, as needed. They often fished in the lake. They wore clothes made of woven flax and bark fibers. An incised ceramic vessel shows trade links to Valais and a rock crystal shows that they traded with other alpine villages. About half of their flint tools came from local flint sources, while the rest of the flint came from distant regions including, southern Germany, the southern Rhone Valley and Champagne. One copper knife blade was also discovered at the site.

The other prehistoric sites include a Roman cremation grave in Rogget, early medieval finds in Gaicht and a burial ground in Gauchete.

The settlement of Rogget northeast of Wingreis was first mentioned in 1235. During the 14th century it was abandoned, probably due to a massive rockslide.

During the Middle Ages Twann was the capital of the Herrschaft of the Lords of Twann. In 1250, however, their line died out and it was inherited by the Baron de Diesse. Shortly thereafter it went to the Vaumarcus family and then the Bolligen family. The Bolligens held Twann until 1422 when they sold it to the Bernese Schultheiss Rudolf Hofmeister. He established it as a Twingrecht or lower jurisdiction with a judge in 1426. Rights over parts of the village were held by a number of different nobles, but by 1470 the right to hold a court in Twann was split between Bern and the Prince-Bishopric of Basel.

The village church of St. Martin was first mentioned in 1228 and belonged to the diocese of Lausanne. The first church was built in the 9th or 10th century. This building was replaced in the 13th century and again in the 15th century. The current appearance of the church comes from Abraham Dünz the Elder's renovation in 1666–67. In 1237 Kuno von Twann gave the right to appoint the village priest to the Münchenbuchsee Commandery. During the Reformation, the Commandery was dissolved and in 1528 control over the church went to Bern.

The local economy was based on viticulture, fishing and animal husbandry. Weekly markets allowed the residents to buy any grain that they needed. Many of the vineyards were owned by Bernese nobles or by Engelberg Abbey, Münchenbuchsee Commandery and Fraubrunnen Abbey. After the Reformation, the monastery vineyards were acquired by Bern and leased out to local farmers. In Wingreis, the Rebhaus Thormanngut, a vineyard manor house, was built in the 16th century for Bernese patricians.

For most of the history of Twann, the main transportation mode was by ship. The first road that connected Twann to Biel was built in 1835–1838. About twenty years later it was followed by the Biel-Neuchatel railway line in 1858–1860. The expansion of the railway and the highway, in 1969–1978, separated the village completely from the lake. While viticulture is still important to the village, tourism, a shipyard and a construction company are also important parts of the local economy. In 1977-80 a vacation village was built on the Twannberg. It was sold and converted into a hotel in 2009.

=== Tüscherz-Alfermée ===
Tüscherz and Alfermée were part of the lands of the Counts of Neuchatel-Nidau, until 1388 when the counts died out and the land was acquired by Bern. Originally it was part of the parish of Sutz which was located on the opposite side of the lake. The priest at Sutz allowed the Mass to be read in the chapel above Tüscherz. After the Protestant Reformation the chapel was closed, but it remained part of the Sutz parish until the parish was dissolved in 1876. Tüscherz and Alfermée then became part of the parish of Twann. In 2010 the parishes of Twann / Tüscherz-Alfermée and Ligerz merged to become the Pilgerweg Bielersee parish.

Viticulture and fishing dominated the villages, because there was little land for growing grain. Some of the residents even rented fields across the lake in Sutz. Many of the vineyards were owned by monasteries, hospitals and lower nobility or burghers of Bern, Biel and Nidau. Several vineyard estates were owned by St. Urban's Abbey, including the Schünen estate which was bought in 1256 and later abandoned and the Convalet estate which was owned by the Abbey until 1848. In the 18th century it was expanded into a large manor house but it was demolished in 1859. The Biel/Bienne road (built in 1838), the Biel/Bienne-Neuchatel railroad (built 1860) and the A5 motorway (1973) isolate the villages from the lake. The lower village of Alfermée was built on land won from the lake after the Jura water correction in 1868-91 but was demolished in 1969 to clear land for the motorway. Until 1973 the primary school was located in the municipality, then it relocated to Twann. The vineyards are still an important industry, though now about two-thirds of the working population commute to Biel/Bienne for work.

== Geography ==
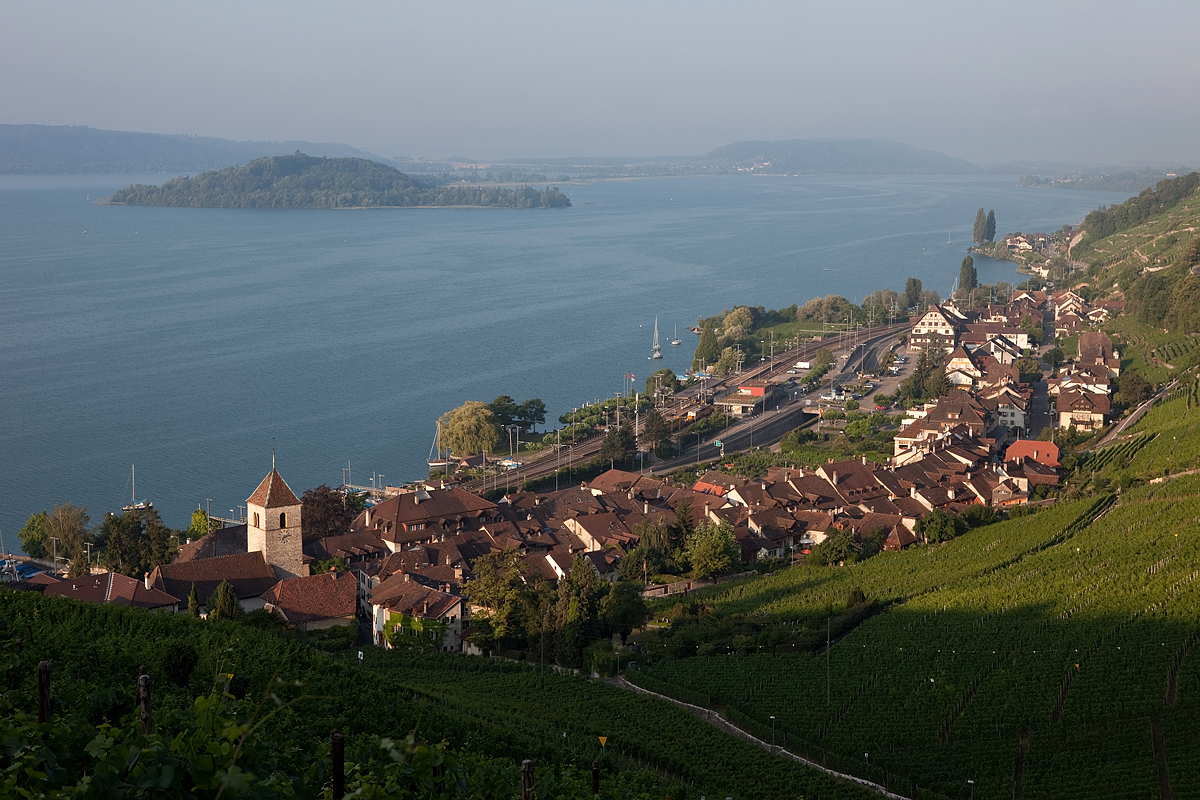
Twann village with Lake Biel and St. Peter's Island in the background

Twann-Tüscherz has an area of 12.33 km^{2} (4.76 sq mi). As of 2012, a total of 2.98 km^{2} (1.15 mi^{2}) or 24.0% is used for agricultural purposes, while 8.06 km^{2} (3.11 mi^{2}) or 64.8% is forested. The rest of the municipality is 1 km^{2} (0.39 mi^{2}) or 8.0% is settled (buildings or roads), 0.02 km^{2} (4.9 acres) or 0.2% is either rivers or lakes and 0.35 km^{2} (0.14 mi^{2}) or 2.8% is unproductive land.

During the same year, housing and buildings made up 3.3% and transportation infrastructure made up 3.9%. All of the forested land area is covered with heavy forests. Of the agricultural land, 9.3% is used for growing crops and 9.1% is pasturage, while 5.5% is used for orchards or vine crops. All the water in the municipality is in lakes.

It is located on the northern shore of Lake Biel and is made up of the villages of Twann, Wingreis, Tüscherz and Alfermée along with part of the village of Kleintwann, the settlements of Gaicht (676 m [2,218 ft]) and Twannberg (868 m [2,848 ft]) on a terrace in the Jura Mountains and St. Peters Island (Sankt Petersinsel) in the lake.

== Demographics ==
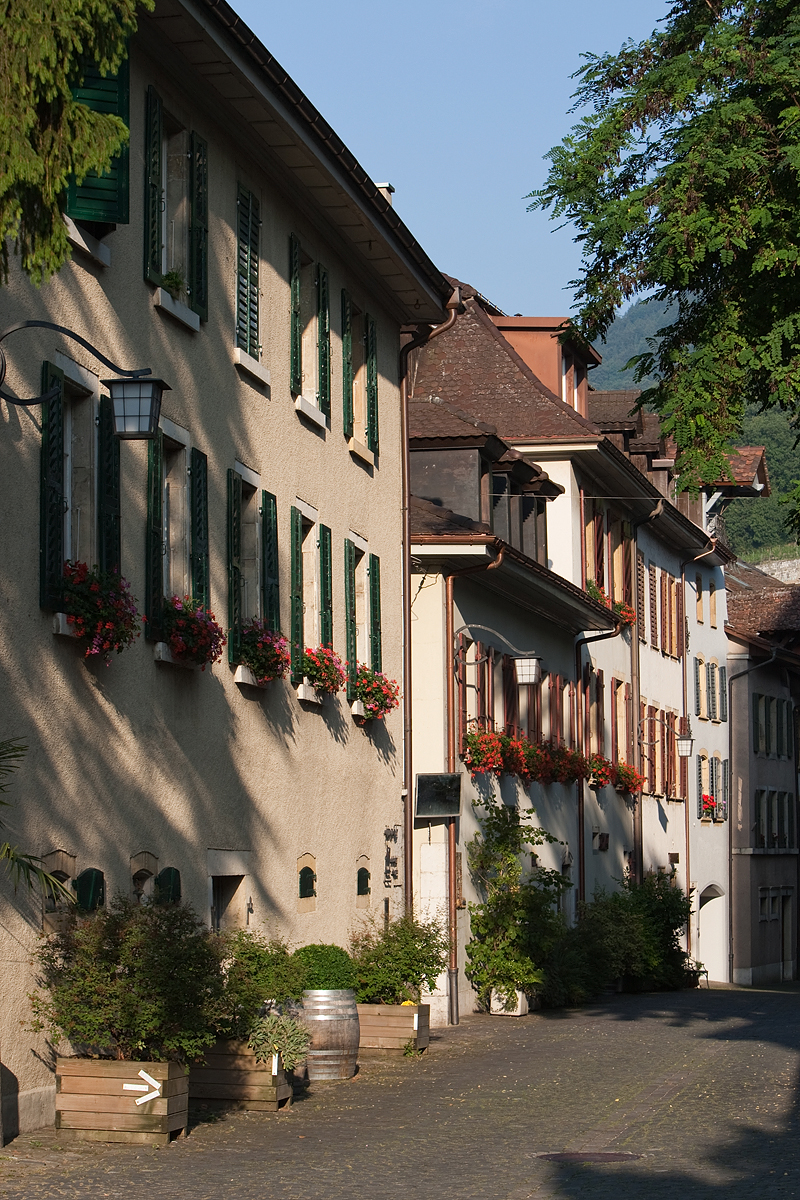
Dorfgasse street in Twann

Twann-Tüscherz has a population (as of December 2020) of 1,171. As of 2010, 8.5% of the population are resident foreign nationals. Over the last 10 years (2001–2011) the population has changed at a rate of -1.8%. Migration accounted for -1.7%, while births and deaths accounted for -0.4%.

Most of the population (as of 2000) speaks German (87%) as their first language, French is the second most common (6.9%) and Italian is the third (0.6%).

As of 2008, the population was 49.3% male and 50.7% female. The population was made up of 511 Swiss men (44.9% of the population) and 50 (4.4%) non-Swiss men. There were 531 Swiss women (46.6%) and 4 (0.4%) non-Swiss women.

As of 2011, children and teenagers (0–19 years old) make up 15.7% of the population, while adults (20–64 years old) make up 60% and seniors (over 64 years old) make up 24.2%.

As of 2010, there were 198 households that consist of only one person and 13 households with five or more people. As of 2010, the construction rate of new housing units was 3.5 new units per 1000 residents. The vacancy rate for the municipality, in 2012, was 3.6%. In 2011, single family homes made up 54.0% of the total housing in the municipality.

== Historic Population ==
The historical population is given in the following chart:

== World Heritage Site ==
It is home to the Twann Bahnhof prehistoric pile-dwelling (or stilt house) settlements that are part of the Prehistoric Pile dwellings around the Alps UNESCO World Heritage Site.

Twann Bahnhof is one of the best dated prehistoric lakeside settlements. The wooden piles have been dendrochronologically dated to 3838-3768 BC, 3702-3698 BC, 3662 BC, 3649-3631 BC, 3622-3607 BC, 3596-3573 BC, 3563-3532 BC, 3405-3391 BC, 3176-3166 BC and 3093-3074 BC. The site was discovered in the mid-1870s during digging of a well. One large scale excavation was carried out in 1974–76, while test borings in 1984-87 indicated that some of the archeological layers extend far into the lake. The total site is estimated to cover 12,000 square meters (130,000 sq ft), but only 1,200 square meters (13,000 sq ft) were excavated in 1974–76. The underwater portion of the site has not been explored. A few years after the excavation the results of the studies were published in a 20 volume collection, which is considered the definitive reference on the Neolithic development in western Switzerland.

== Heritage sites of national significance ==
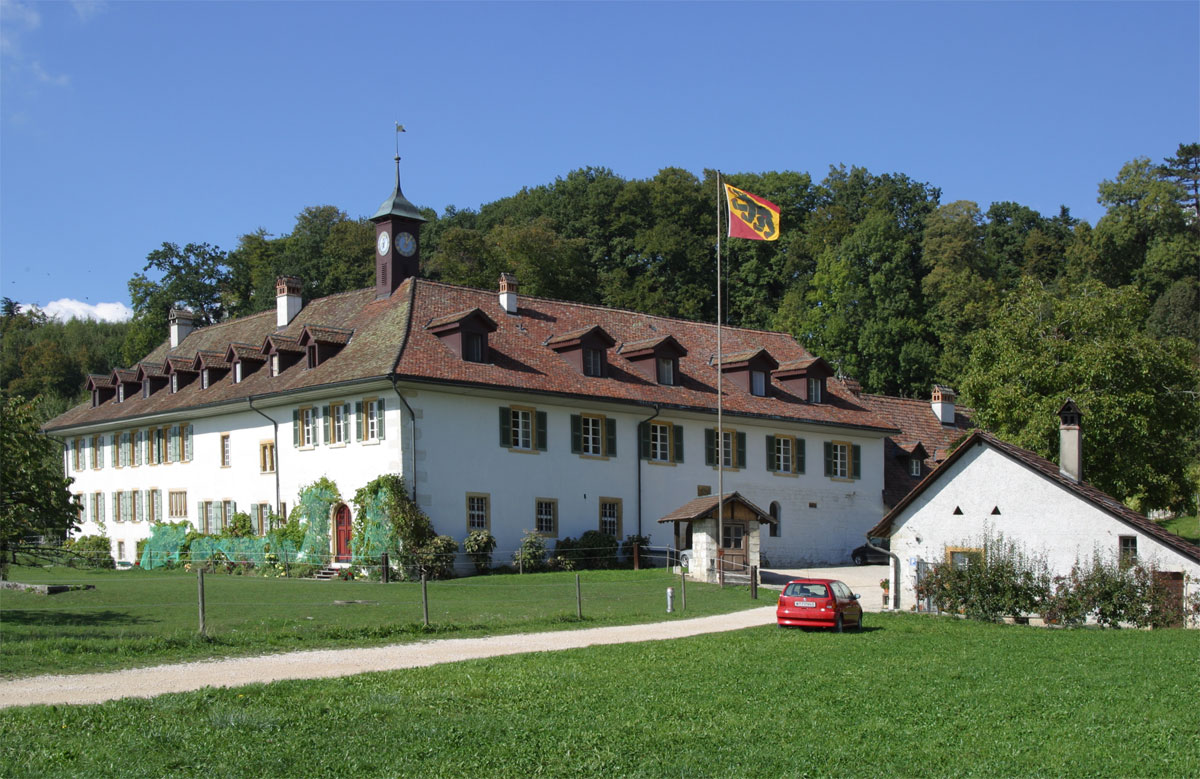
Former Clunic Priory

The Former Clunic Priory at St. Peter's Island, the former Thormanngut building and the Fraubrunnen house are listed as Swiss heritage site of national significance. The villages of Tüscherz and Twann and the hamlet of Wingreis are all part of the Inventory of Swiss Heritage Sites.

== Politics ==
In the 2011 federal election the most popular party was the SVP which received 25.7% of the vote. The next three most popular parties were the SPS (21.4%), the BDP Party (17.7%) and the FDP (14.8%). In the federal election, a total of 493 votes were cast, and the voter turnout was 53.6%.

== Economy ==
As of 2011, Twann-Tüscherz had an unemployment rate of 1.76%. As of 2008, there were a total of 422 people employed in the municipality. Of these, there were 132 people employed in the primary economic sector and about 50 businesses involved in this sector. 51 people were employed in the secondary sector and there were 16 businesses in this sector. 239 people were employed in the tertiary sector, with 39 businesses in this sector. Of the working population, 17.9% used public transportation to get to work, and 52.4% used a private car.

In 2011 the average local and cantonal tax rate on a married resident, with two children, of Twann-Tüscherz making 150,000 CHF was 12%, while an unmarried resident's rate was 17.6%. For comparison, the average rate for the entire canton in the same year, was 14.2% and 22.0%, while the nationwide average was 12.3% and 21.1% respectively.

== Religion ==
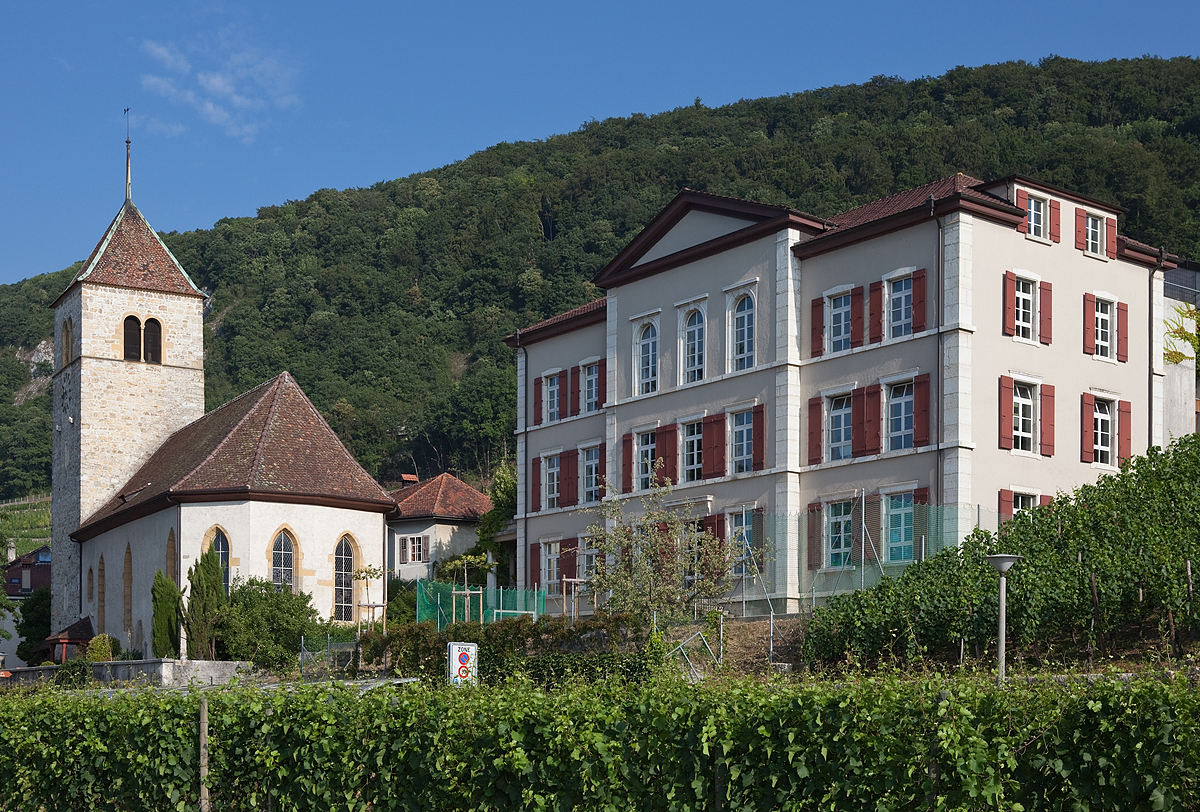
Twann's church and school house

In 2000 about 67.8% of the population belonged to a Protestant church, 14.8% were Roman Catholic and 11.2% had no religious affiliation.

== Education ==
In Twann-Tüscherz about 53% of the population have completed non-mandatory upper secondary education, and 26.4% have completed additional higher education (either university or a Fachhochschule).

The Canton of Bern school system provides one year of non-obligatory Kindergarten, followed by six years of Primary school. This is followed by three years of obligatory lower Secondary school where the students are separated according to ability and aptitude. Following the lower Secondary students may attend additional schooling or they may enter an apprenticeship.

During the 2009–10 school year, there were a total of 137 students attending classes in Twann-Tüscherz. There were 2 kindergarten classes with a total of 20 students in the municipality. Of the kindergarten students, 15.0% were permanent or temporary residents of Switzerland (not citizens) and 15.0% have a different mother language than the classroom language. The municipality had 4 primary classes and 72 students. Of the primary students, 8.3% were permanent or temporary residents of Switzerland (not citizens) and 8.3% have a different mother language than the classroom language. During the same year, there were 3 lower secondary classes with a total of 45 students.
