= Sutz-Lattrigen =

- Municipality
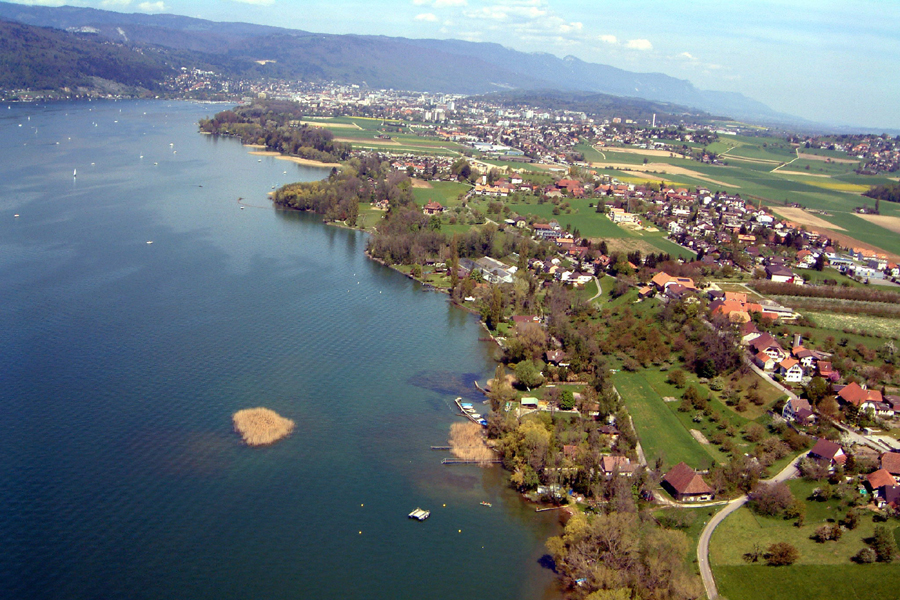
- Aerial view of Sutz and Lattrigen villages

- Flag Coat of arms
- Location of Sutz-Lattrigen
- Location within Switzerland Location within Canton of Bern
- Coordinates: 47°6′N 7°13′E
- Country: Switzerland
- Canton: Bern
- District: Biel/Bienne

Government
  - Executive: Gemeinderat with 5 members
  - Mayor: Gemeindepräsident; Daniel Kopp OV (as of 2026)

Area
  - Total: 3.6 km^{2} (1.4 sq mi)
- Elevation: 450 m (1,480 ft)

Population (December 2020)
  - Total: 1,399
  - Density: 390/km^{2} (1,000/sq mi)
- Time zone: UTC+01:00 (CET)
  - Summer (DST): UTC+02:00 (CEST)
- Postal code: 2572
- SFOS number: 750
- ISO 3166 code: CH-BE
- Surrounded by: Bellmund, Hermrigen, Ipsach, Mörigen, Tüscherz-Alfermée, Twann
- Website: www.sutz-lattrigen.ch

Sutz-Lattrigen is a municipality in the Biel/Bienne administrative district in the canton of Bern in Switzerland. It is home to a number of Neolithic and Bronze Age lake shore archeological sites, including one that is part of a UNESCO World Heritage Site.

== History ==
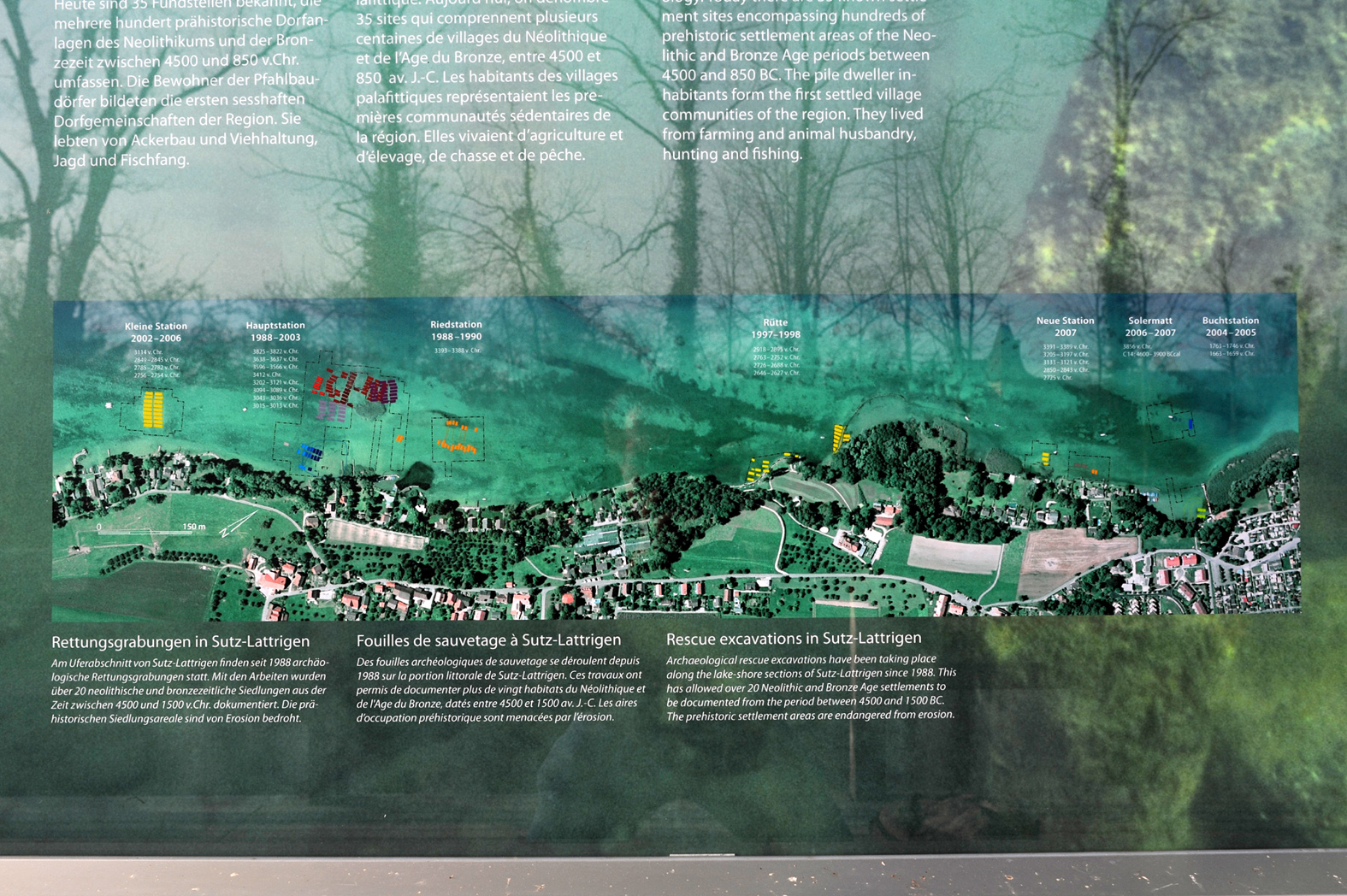
Information board at Sutz-Lattrigen showing many of the prehistoric sites in the municipality.

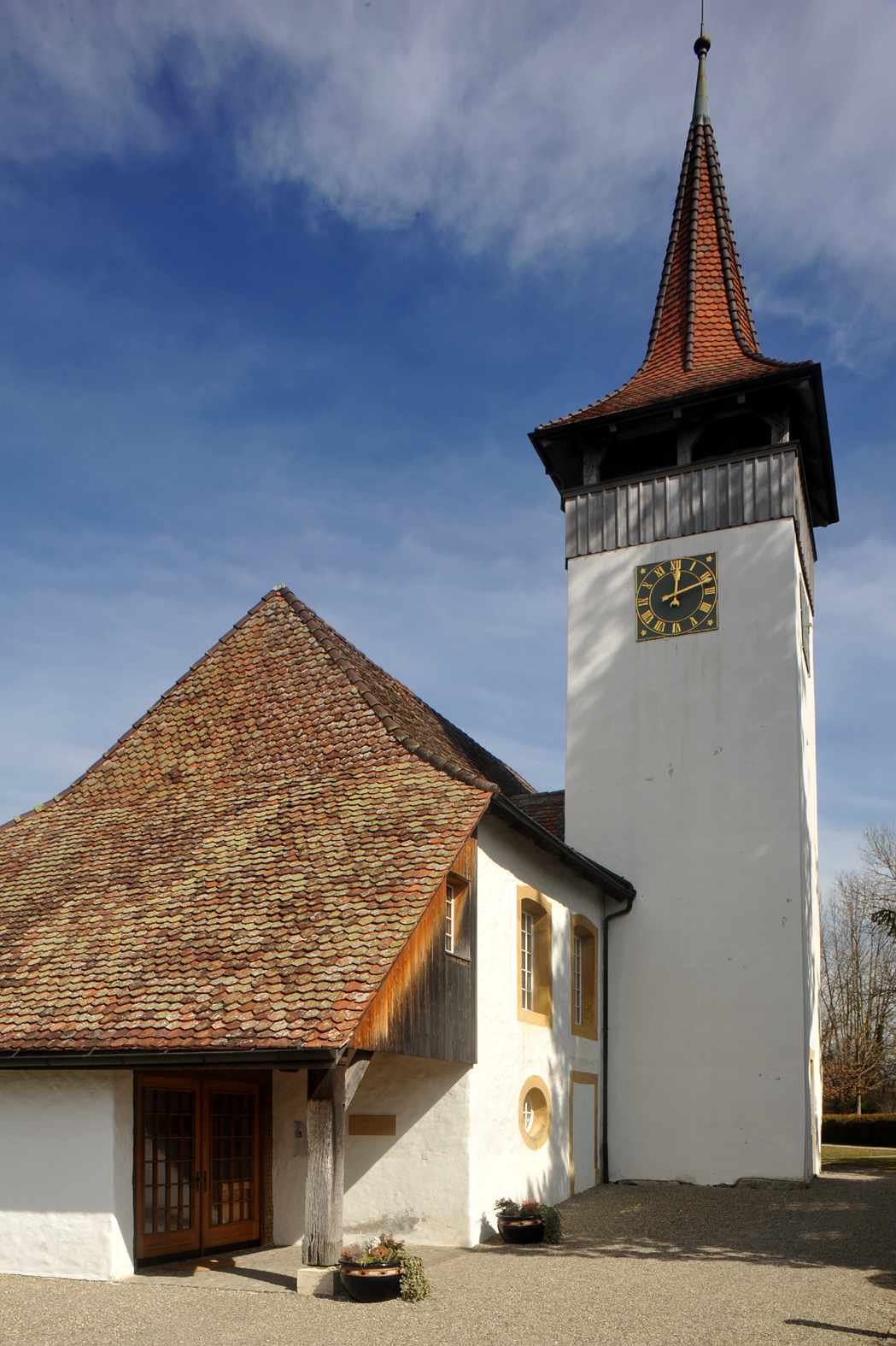
Sutz-Lattrigen village church

The municipality is situated on the shore of Lake Biel. In 2007, the remains of the oldest known building in Switzerland – a pile dwelling dated to 3863 BC – were discovered in the lake near Sutz-Lattrigen. The shoreline was occupied by a Corded ware culture settlement through the Neolithic and into the Bronze Age. In 2011 the remains of the settlement was included in an UNESCO World Heritage Site.

Sutz village is first mentioned in 1228 as Soz. In 1262 or 1263 it was mentioned as Souz. Lattrigen village was first mentioned in 1270 as Lattringun. During the Middle Ages the villages were both part of the lands of the Counts of Neuchâtel-Nidau. In 1398, the two villages and much of the surrounding area were acquired by the city of Bern. A number of local patrician families and monastic houses owned land or rights in Sutz and Lattrigen over the following century. Gradually, the Abbeys of St. Alban in Basel, Frienisberg, Gottstatt and the Münchenbuchsee Commandery acquired most of the land. However, in 1528, Bern adopted the new faith of the Protestant Reformation and secularized all the Abbeys' lands, bringing Sutz and Lattrigen under direct Bernese control. Following the 1798 French invasion, Sutz-Lattrigen became part of the Helvetic Republic district of Seeland. With the 1803 Act of Mediation it became part of the district of Nidau.

The village church of Sutz was first mentioned in 1228, though the romanesque walls indicate that it is older. The bell tower was built in 1485, while the choir is from 1510. The Sutz parish included the villages of Tüscherz and Alfermée (both now part of Twann-Tüscherz) from across the lake. The villages remained part of the Sutz parish until 1993, when they formed their own.

In the 17th century Bern built a pier and warehouse in Lattrigen, which connected the village to lake trade routes. The villages were connected to the Täuffelen-Biel/Bienne railroad in 1916. The villages of Sutz and Lattrigen shared a school and farm land and gradually grew into a single municipality. In the 1950s the population of both villages grew and they expanded into a single continuous settlement.

== Geography ==
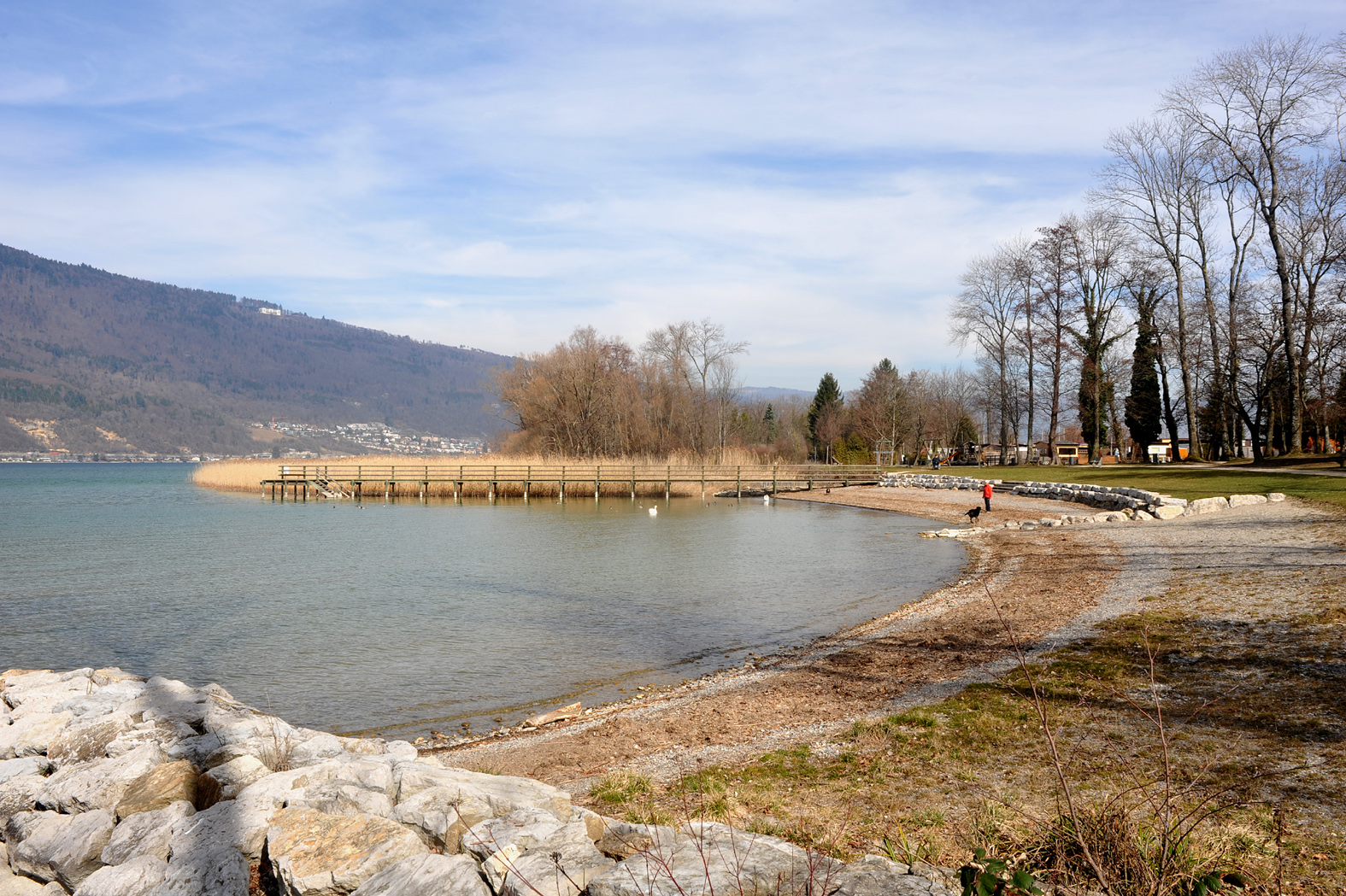
Lake shore at Sutz-Lattrigen

Aerial view (1959)

Sutz-Lattrigen has an area of 3.57 km^{2} (1.38 sq mi). As of 2012, a total of 1.59 km^{2} (0.61 mi^{2}) or 44.2% is used for agricultural purposes, while 1.14 km^{2} (0.44 mi^{2}) or 31.7% is forested. The rest of the municipality is 0.77 km^{2} (0.30 mi^{2}) or 21.4% is settled (buildings or roads), 0.09 km^{2} (22 acres) or 2.5% is either rivers or lakes and 0.02 km^{2} (4.9 acres) or 0.6% is unproductive land.

During the same year, housing and buildings made up 11.7% and transportation infrastructure made up 3.9%. Power and water infrastructure as well as other special developed areas made up 1.4% of the area while parks, green belts and sports fields made up 3.6%. All of the forested land area is covered with heavy forests. Of the agricultural land, 33.9% is used for growing crops and 5.0% is pasturage, while 5.3% is used for orchards or vine crops. Of the water in the municipality, 1.9% is in lakes and 0.6% is in rivers and streams.

The municipality is located on the right bank of Lake Biel. It consists of the villages of Sutz and Lattrigen.

On 31 December 2009 Amtsbezirk Nidau, the municipality's former district, was dissolved. On the following day, 1 January 2010, it joined the newly created Verwaltungskreis Biel/Bienne.

== Coat of arms ==
The blazon of the municipal coat of arms is Gules an Anchor Argent between two Mullets Or in chief.

== Demographics ==
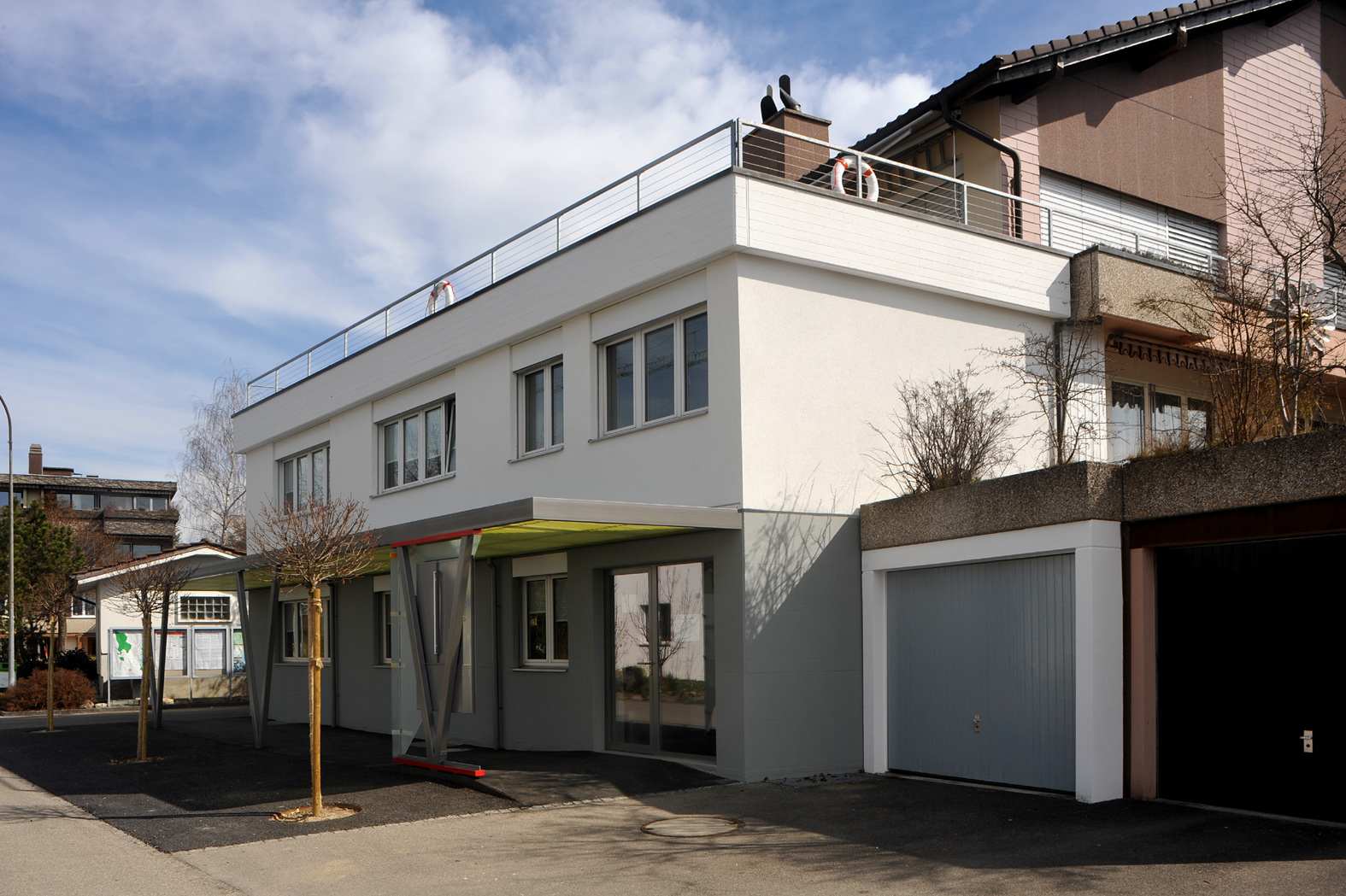
Municipal administration building in Sutz-Lattrigen

Sutz-Lattrigen has a population (as of December 2020) of 1,399. As of 2010, 7.1% of the population are resident foreign nationals. Over the last 10 years (2001-2011) the population has changed at a rate of 0.7%. Migration accounted for 0.1%, while births and deaths accounted for 0.4%.

Most of the population (as of 2000) speaks German (1,064 or 92.4%) as their first language, French is the second most common (53 or 4.6%) and Spanish is the third (9 or 0.8%). There are 7 people who speak Italian and 1 person who speaks Romansh.

As of 2008, the population was 48.1% male and 51.9% female. The population was made up of 596 Swiss men (44.4% of the population) and 50 (3.7%) non-Swiss men. There were 652 Swiss women (48.5%) and 4 (0.3%) non-Swiss women. Of the population in the municipality, 256 or about 22.2% were born in Sutz-Lattrigen and lived there in 2000. There were 552 or 48.0% who were born in the same canton, while 208 or 18.1% were born somewhere else in Switzerland, and 96 or 8.3% were born outside of Switzerland.

As of 2011, children and teenagers (0–19 years old) make up 22.4% of the population, while adults (20–64 years old) make up 61.1% and seniors (over 64 years old) make up 16.5%.

As of 2000, there were 472 people who were single and never married in the municipality. There were 569 married individuals, 60 widows or widowers and 50 individuals who are divorced.

As of 2010, there were 170 households that consist of only one person and 27 households with five or more people. In 2000, a total of 462 apartments (83.7% of the total) were permanently occupied, while 76 apartments (13.8%) were seasonally occupied and 14 apartments (2.5%) were empty. As of 2010, the construction rate of new housing units was 1.5 new units per 1000 residents. The vacancy rate for the municipality, in 2012, was 0.9%. In 2011, single family homes made up 69.8% of the total housing in the municipality.

The historical population is given in the following chart:

== Heritage sites of national significance ==
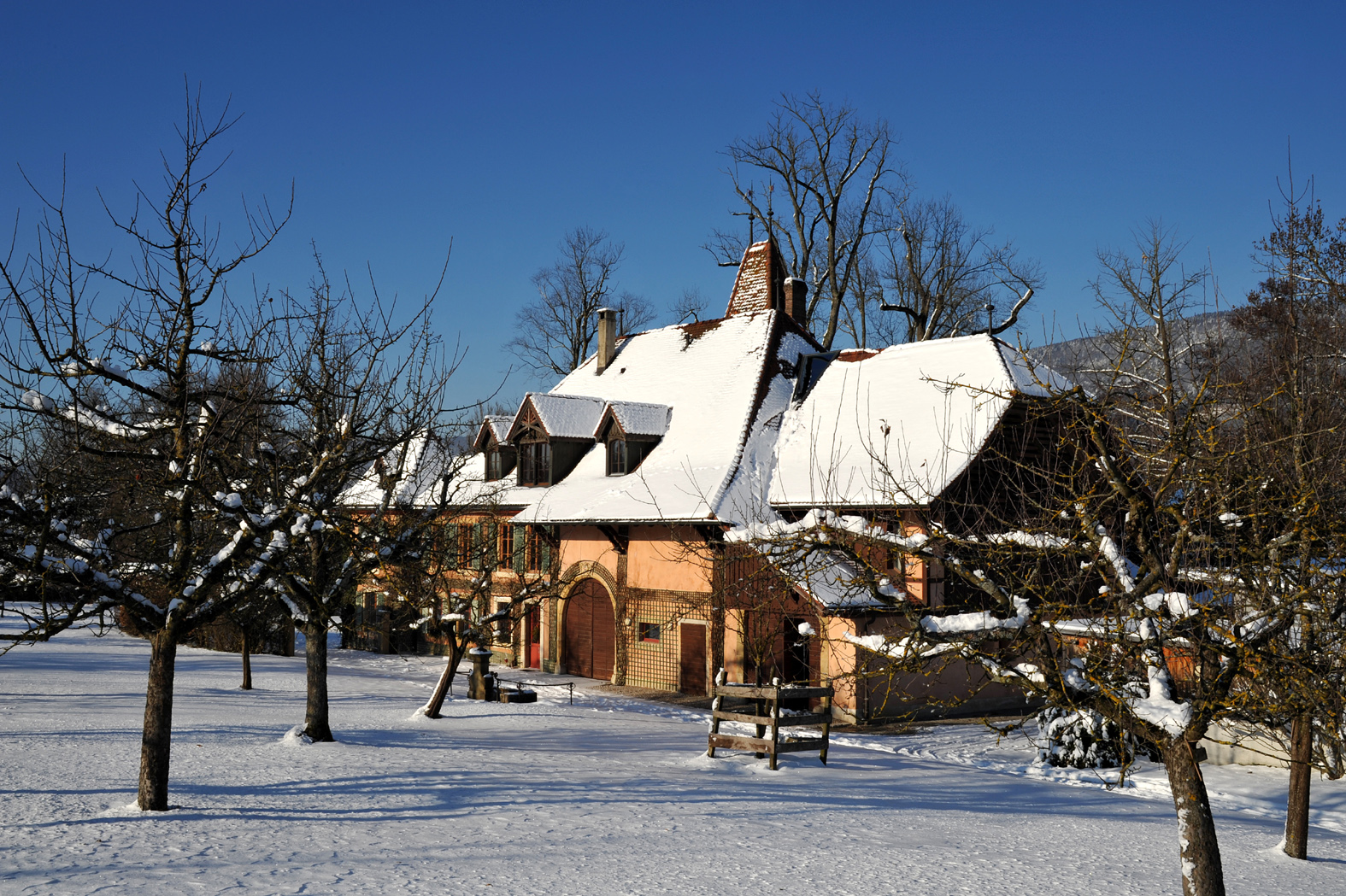
The Von Rütte-Gut or Von Rütte Estate

The Neolithic / Bronze Age lake-side settlement of Sutz-Lattrigen–Rütte and the Von Rütte-Gut are listed as Swiss heritage site of national significance.

== World Heritage Site ==
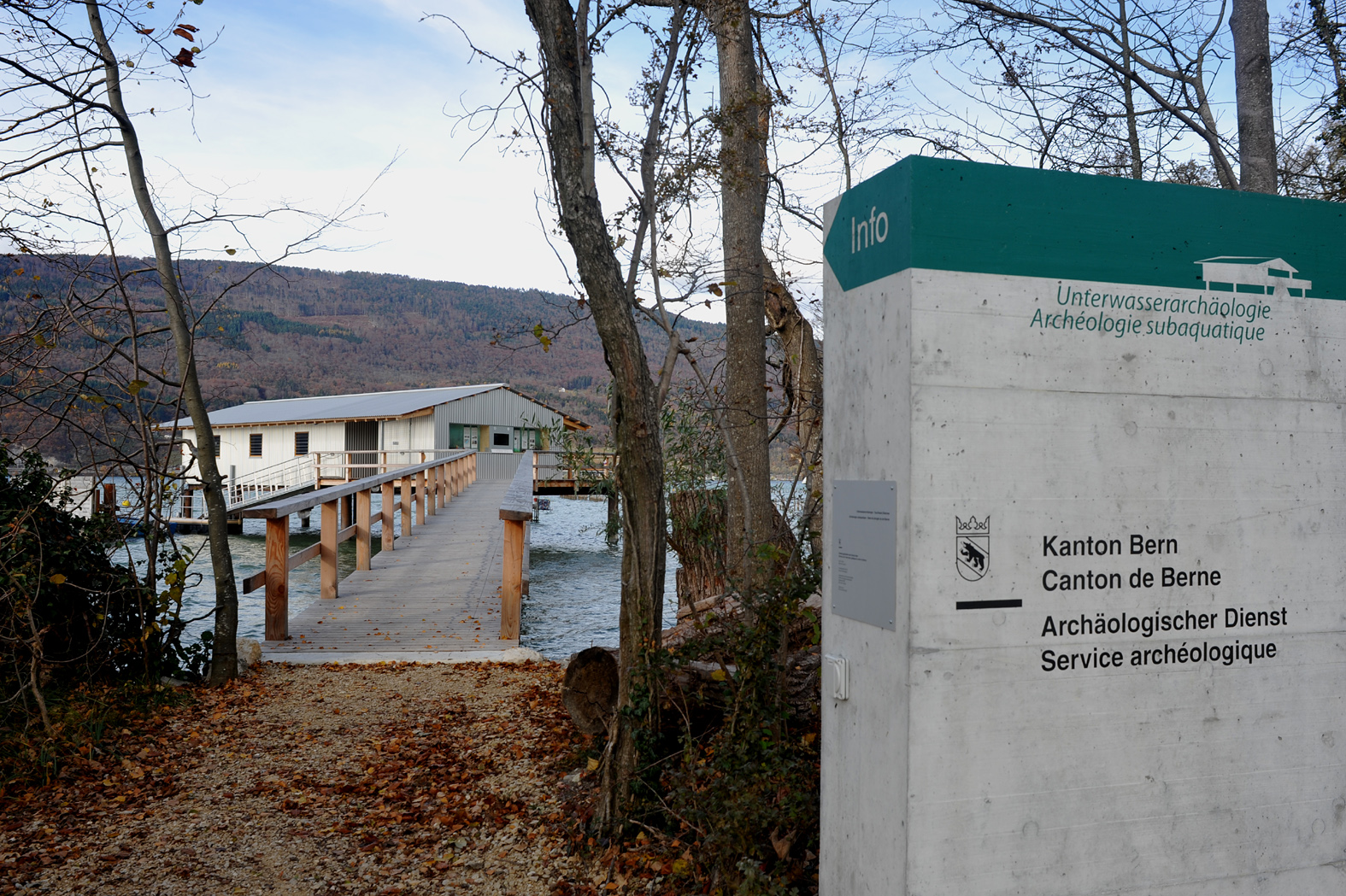
Canton of Bern archeological office on the lake shore, near the prehistoric sites

It is home to the Sutz-Lattrigen–Rütte prehistoric pile-dwelling (or stilt house) settlement that is part of the Prehistoric Pile dwellings around the Alps UNESCO World Heritage Site.

The Sutz-Lattrigen–Rütte, named after the nearby von Rütte estate, was occupied during the final neolithic period and contains the remains of several settlements and artifacts from the rise of the Corded Ware culture. There are only a few Corded Ware culture sites in Europe and all the known settlements are in Switzerland. Additionally, the only western Swiss lakeside bell beaker pottery was found at the site.

The first village at the site has been dendrochronologically dated to 2763-2746 BC, but very little is known about it. The next settlement of 12 houses, was dated to 2736-2688 BC and 2627 BC. This settlement was destroyed in a fire in 2704 BC and at least 12 new houses were built immediately there after.

== Politics ==
In the 2011 federal election the most popular party was the Swiss People's Party (SVP) which received 29.7% of the vote. The next three most popular parties were the Social Democratic Party (SP) (18.3%), the Conservative Democratic Party (BDP) (15.7%) and the Green Party (9.6%). In the federal election, a total of 530 votes were cast, and the voter turnout was 53.4%.

== Economy ==
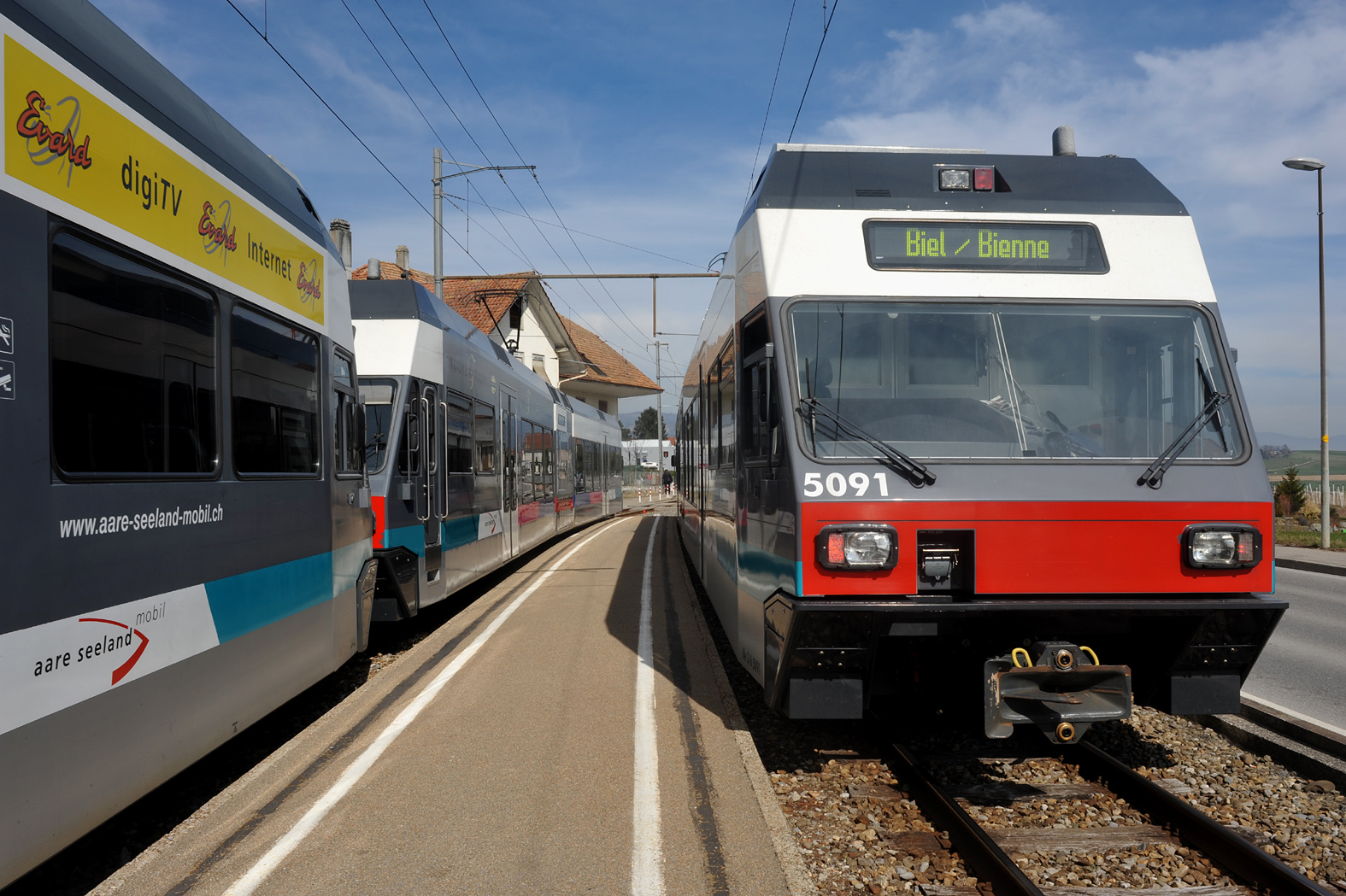
Sutz-Lattrigen train station

As of 2011, Sutz-Lattrigen had an unemployment rate of 1.47%. As of 2008, there were a total of 382 people employed in the municipality. Of these, there were 36 people employed in the primary economic sector and about 13 businesses involved in this sector. 163 people were employed in the secondary sector and there were 12 businesses in this sector. 183 people were employed in the tertiary sector, with 40 businesses in this sector. There were 620 residents of the municipality who were employed in some capacity, of which females made up 43.7% of the workforce.

In 2008 there were a total of 299 full-time equivalent jobs. The number of jobs in the primary sector was 16, all of which were in agriculture. The number of jobs in the secondary sector was 150 of which 85 or (56.7%) were in manufacturing, 52 or (34.7%) were in mining and 2 (1.3%) were in construction. The number of jobs in the tertiary sector was 133. In the tertiary sector; 34 or 25.6% were in wholesale or retail sales or the repair of motor vehicles, 4 or 3.0% were in the movement and storage of goods, 17 or 12.8% were in a hotel or restaurant, 19 or 14.3% were technical professionals or scientists, 7 or 5.3% were in education and 16 or 12.0% were in health care.

In 2000, there were 239 workers who commuted into the municipality and 494 workers who commuted away. The municipality is a net exporter of workers, with about 2.1 workers leaving the municipality for every one entering. A total of 126 workers (34.5% of the 365 total workers in the municipality) both lived and worked in Sutz-Lattrigen. Of the working population, 23.1% used public transportation to get to work, and 54% used a private car.

In 2011 the average local and cantonal tax rate on a married resident, with two children, of Sutz-Lattrigen making 150,000 CHF was 12.9%, while an unmarried resident's rate was 18.9%. For comparison, the average rate for the entire canton in the same year, was 14.2% and 22.0%, while the nationwide average was 12.3% and 21.1% respectively. In 2009 there were a total of 607 tax payers in the municipality. Of that total, 243 made over 75,000 CHF per year. There were 3 people who made between 15,000 and 20,000 per year. The average income of the over 75,000 CHF group in Sutz-Lattrigen was 130,295 CHF, while the average across all of Switzerland was 130,478 CHF.

In 2011 a total of 1.5% of the population received direct financial assistance from the government.

== Religion ==
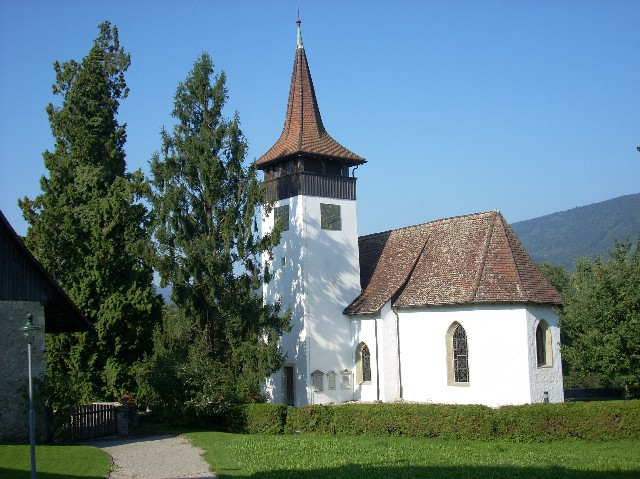
Sutz-Lattrigen Swiss Reformed church

From the 2000 census, 749 or 65.1% belonged to the Swiss Reformed Church, while 179 or 15.6% were Roman Catholic. Of the rest of the population, there were 2 members of an Orthodox church (or about 0.17% of the population), there were 5 individuals (or about 0.43% of the population) who belonged to the Christian Catholic Church, and there were 53 individuals (or about 4.60% of the population) who belonged to another Christian church. There was 1 individual who was Jewish, and 23 (or about 2.00% of the population) who were Islamic. There was 1 person who was Buddhist and 1 individual who belonged to another church. 107 (or about 9.30% of the population) belonged to no church, are agnostic or atheist, and 30 individuals (or about 2.61% of the population) did not answer the question.

== Education ==
In Sutz-Lattrigen about 58.8% of the population have completed non-mandatory upper secondary education, and 22.7% have completed additional higher education (either university or a Fachhochschule). Of the 165 who had completed some form of tertiary schooling listed in the census, 72.1% were Swiss men, 23.0% were Swiss women.

The Canton of Bern school system provides one year of non-obligatory Kindergarten, followed by six years of Primary school. This is followed by three years of obligatory lower Secondary school where the students are separated according to ability and aptitude. Following the lower Secondary students may attend additional schooling or they may enter an apprenticeship.

During the 2011-12 school year, there were a total of 120 students attending classes in Sutz-Lattrigen. There was one kindergarten class with a total of 24 students in the municipality. Of the kindergarten students, 4.2% were permanent or temporary residents of Switzerland (not citizens). The municipality had 4 primary classes and 96 students. Of the primary students, 5.2% were permanent or temporary residents of Switzerland (not citizens) and 12.5% have a different mother language than the classroom language.

As of 2000, there were a total of 86 students attending any school in the municipality. Of those, 72 both lived and attended school in the municipality, while 14 students came from another municipality. During the same year, 111 residents attended schools outside the municipality.
