= Mörigen =

- Municipality
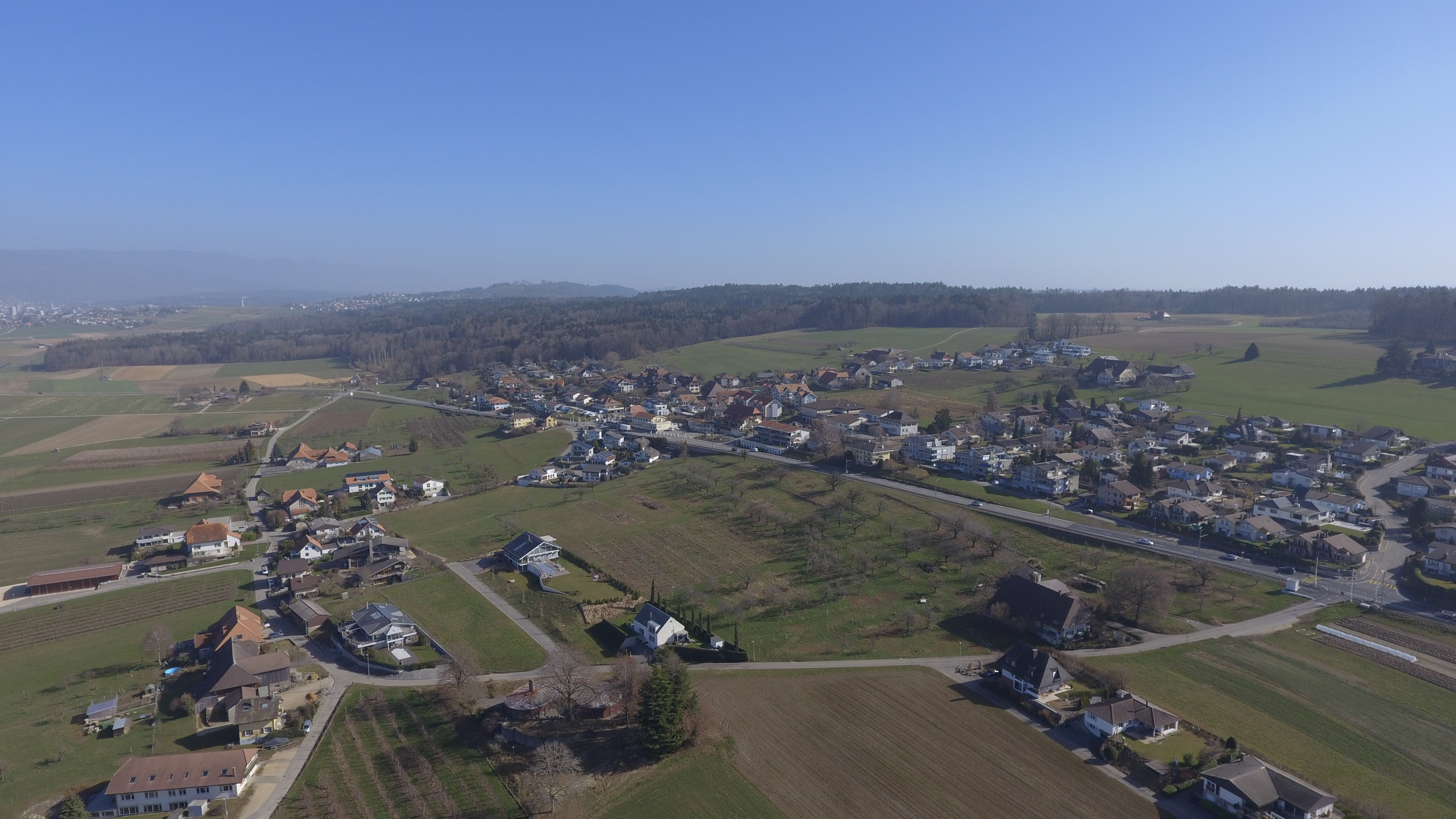

- Flag Coat of arms
- Location of Mörigen
- Location within Switzerland Location within Canton of Bern
- Coordinates: 47°5.1′N 7°12.8′E
- Country: Switzerland
- Canton: Bern
- District: Biel/Bienne

Government
  - Executive: Gemeinderat with 5 members
  - Mayor: Gemeindepräsident; Stefan Gerber (as of 2026)

Area
  - Total: 2.2 km^{2} (0.85 sq mi)
- Elevation: 480 m (1,570 ft)

Population (December 2020)
  - Total: 875
  - Density: 400/km^{2} (1,000/sq mi)
- Time zone: UTC+01:00 (CET)
  - Summer (DST): UTC+02:00 (CEST)
- Postal code: 2572
- SFOS number: 742
- ISO 3166 code: CH-BE
- Surrounded by: Epsach, Hermrigen, Sutz-Lattrigen, Täuffelen, Twann
- Website: www.moerigen.ch

Mörigen is a municipality in the Biel/Bienne administrative district in the canton of Bern in Switzerland.

== History ==
Mörigen is first mentioned in 1196 as Moringen.

=== Prehistoric settlements ===
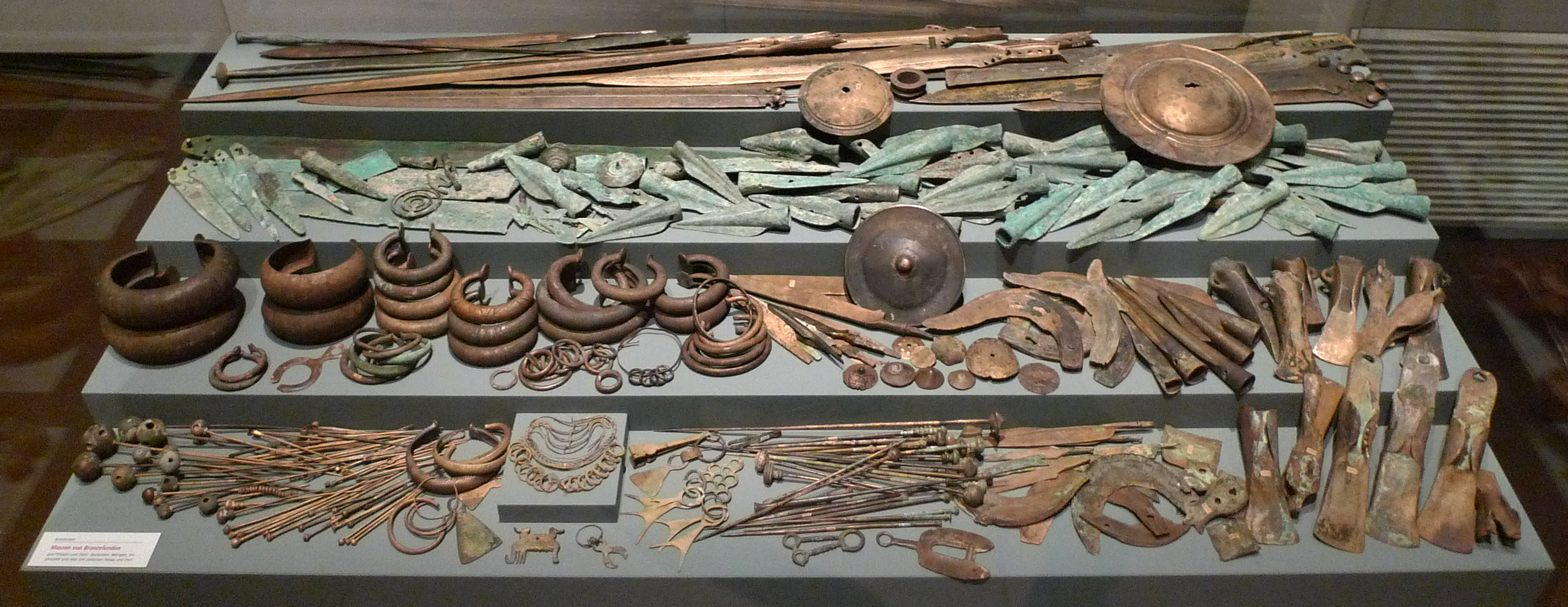
Bronze Age artifacts from Mörigen.

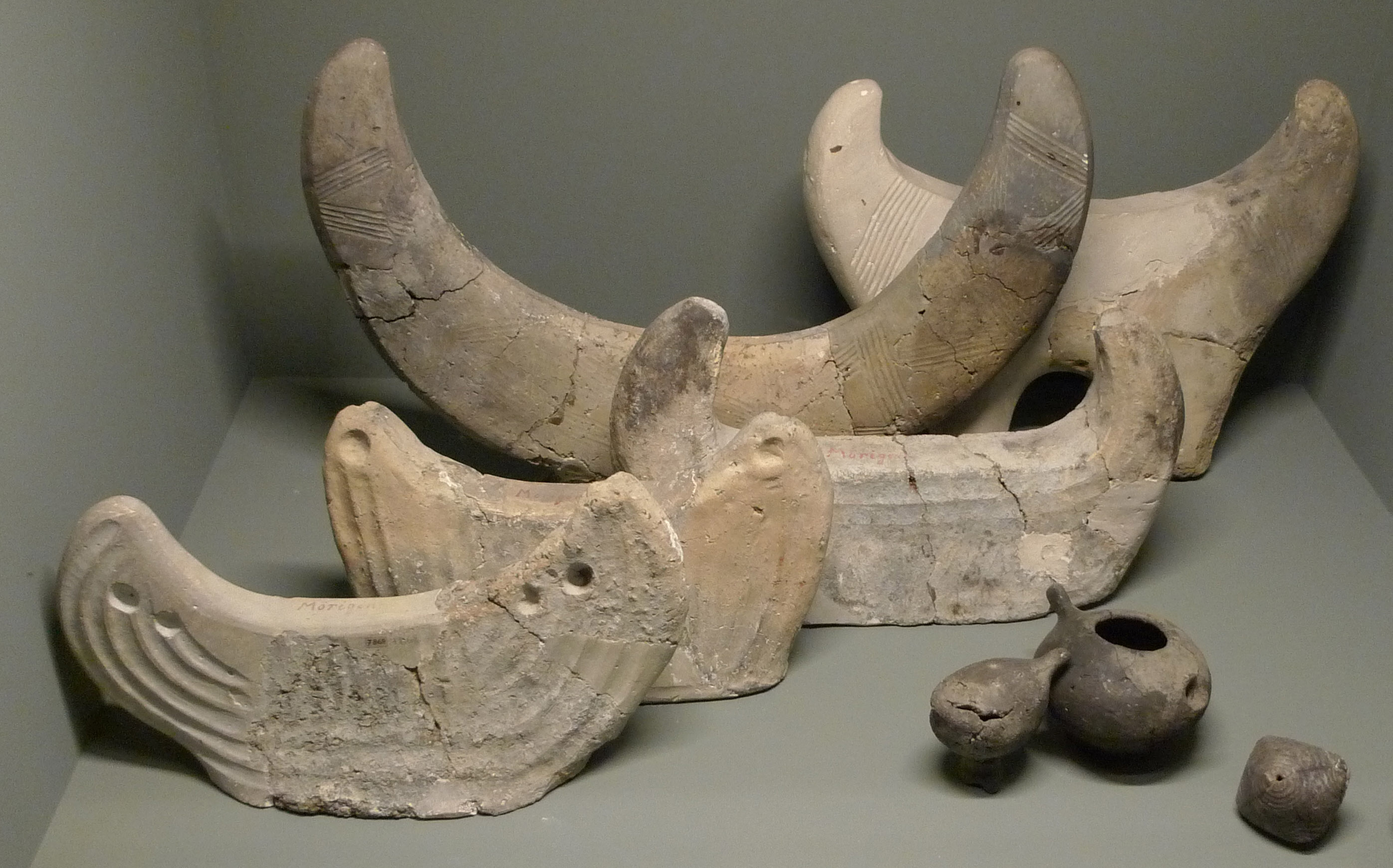
"Moon Horns" (Moon idols) from Mörigen.

During the Bronze Age the lake shore near modern Mörigen was home to a large Urnfield culture stilt house settlement, which probably reached its peak during the 9th century BC. The site was discovered in 1843 and after the Jura water correction dropped the water level in Lake Biel the entire site was exposed. Initially artifacts were collected by amateurs and placed in private collections. The beginning of the collections of the Schwab Museum in Biel, the Laténium in Hauterive and the Swiss National Museum all came from Mörigen.

In 1873 the Bernese government banned private excavations at the site and commissioned Edward Jenner and Edmund Fellberg to lead an expedition to carefully excavate the site. They found the remains of a settlement which was elliptical in shape and about 190 by 120 meters (620 ft × 390 ft) in size. The remains of some of the buildings and bridges were discovered. Willow wickerwork, straw, grain and plants provide an insight into how they lived and what they ate. Today there are about 1,400 bronze artifacts from Mörigen in Swiss museums along with a number in foreign countries. Refining vessels along with sandstone and clay molds provide evidence of bronze refining at Mörigen. The artifacts include 13 swords or fragments of weapons, tools, jewelry, horse bridles and crescent shaped razors based on a northern Italian style. In addition to bronze, some of the bracelets contain pieces of iron, one of the first traces of iron working in Switzerland. Ceramics and opaque glass beads have also been discovered at the site.

In addition to the well researched Bronze Age settlement, at least three earlier settlements existed at Mörigen. The earliest were from the early to the late Neolithic (4th-3rd millennium BC) while the later were from the early Bronze Age. However, these sites were not well studied and have largely disappeared.

During the Roman era there was a small settlement at Grens and possibly a villa at Eyacker. The area remained inhabited in the Early Middle Ages. A few graves from that era were found near the lake shore.

=== From foundation to modern Mörigen ===
During the Middle Ages, the Mörigen region was part of the Herrschaft of Nidau. It was probably administered by the ministerialis (unfree knights in the service of a feudal overlord) family of Mörigen. They probably had castles at Brüel and Ausserfeld to rule over the village and surrounding land. In 1398 the entire Inselgau region of the Herrschaft of Nidau, including Mörigen, was acquired by Bern. The ministerialis family was eventually replaced with knightly families from Bern and Nidau. A filial chapel was built in Ober-Mörigen and by 1497 the priest in Täuffelen was responsible for the chapel. When Mörigen adopted the Protestant Reformation in 1528, along with the rest of Bern, it became part of the Täuffelen parish.

For much of its history, the major industries in Mörigen were raising grain, tending vineyards and fishing. In 1916 the Biel-Täuffelen-Ins railroad connected the village to the rest of the country. Its population began to grow in the 1960s with the completion of a road to Biel along the lake shore. Today Mörigen is a commuter town with about 80% of the population commuting to jobs in Bern and Biel.

== Geography ==
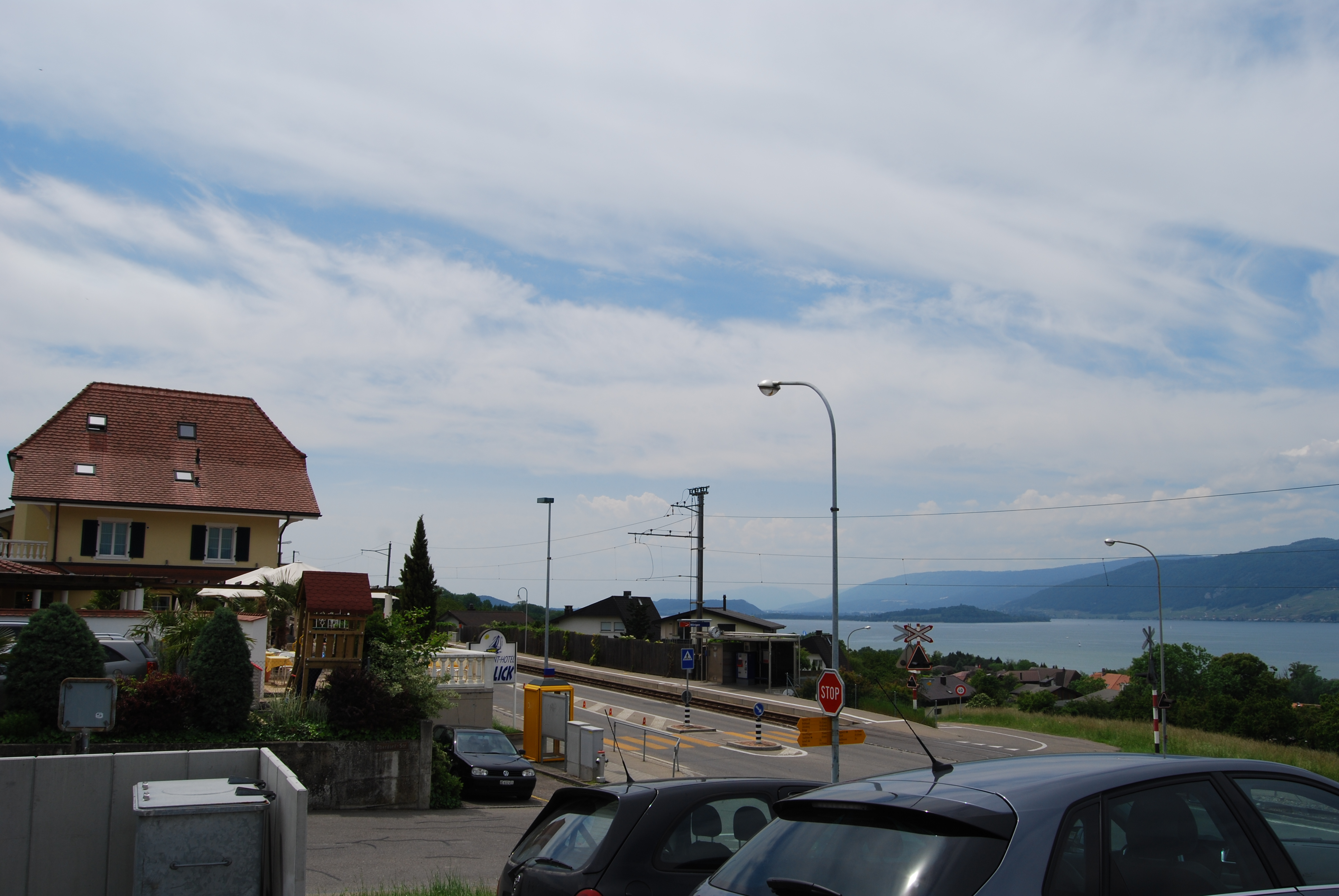
Lake Biel from Mörigen

Mörigen has an area of 2.16 km^{2} (0.83 sq mi). As of 2012, a total of 1.28 km^{2} (0.49 mi^{2}) or 59.3% is used for agricultural purposes, while 0.36 km^{2} (0.14 mi^{2}) or 16.7% is forested. Of the rest of the land, 0.46 km^{2} (0.18 mi^{2}) or 21.3% is settled (buildings or roads) and 0.06 km^{2} (15 acres) or 2.8% is unproductive land.

During the same year, housing and buildings made up 16.7% and transportation infrastructure made up 2.8%. while parks, green belts and sports fields made up 1.4%. Out of the forested land, all of the forested land area is covered with heavy forests. Of the agricultural land, 35.6% is used for growing crops and 13.4% is pastures, while 10.2% is used for orchards or vine crops.

The municipality is located on the right bank of Lake Biel.

On 31 December 2009 Amtsbezirk Nidau, the municipality's former district, was dissolved. On the following day, 1 January 2010, it joined the newly created Verwaltungskreis Biel/Bienne.

== Coat of arms ==
The blazon of the municipal coat of arms is Azure two Stone Axes Argent handled and stripped Or.

== Demographics ==
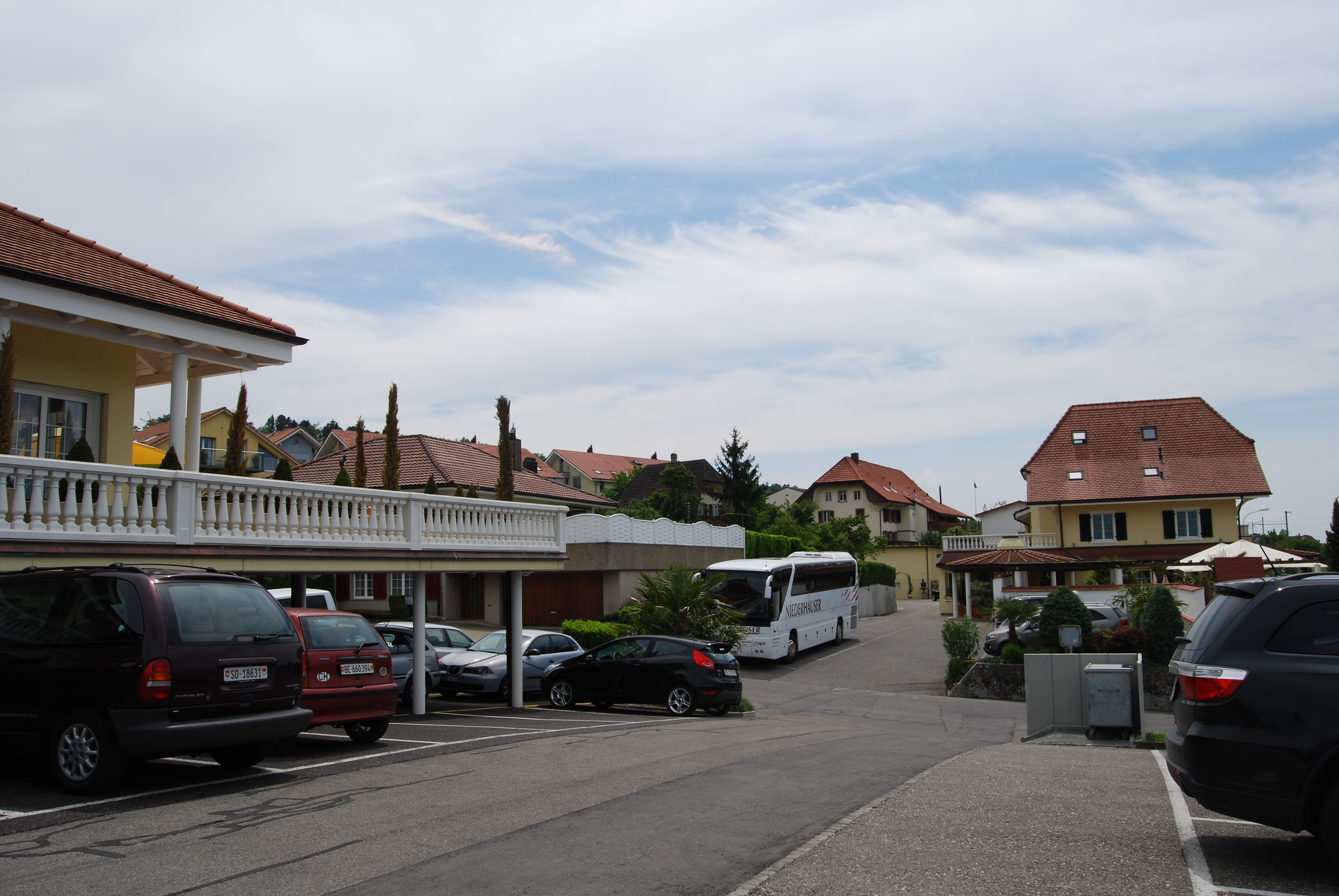
Houses and buildings in Mörigen

Mörigen has a population (as of December 2020) of 875. As of 2010, 4.9% of the population are resident foreign nationals. Over the last 10 years (2001-2011) the population has changed at a rate of 1%. Migration accounted for 1.5%, while births and deaths accounted for -0.5%.

Most of the population (as of 2000) speaks German (653 or 92.6%) as their first language, French is the second most common (43 or 6.1%) and Swedish is the third (4 or 0.6%). There is 1 person who speaks Italian and 1 person who speaks Romansh.

As of 2008, the population was 49.3% male and 50.7% female. The population was made up of 415 Swiss men (47.3% of the population) and 17 (1.9%) non-Swiss men. There were 419 Swiss women (47.8%) and 2 (0.2%) non-Swiss women. Of the population in the municipality, 142 or about 20.1% were born in Mörigen and lived there in 2000. There were 326 or 46.2% who were born in the same canton, while 168 or 23.8% were born somewhere else in Switzerland, and 51 or 7.2% were born outside of Switzerland.

As of 2011, children and teenagers (0–19 years old) make up 20.3% of the population, while adults (20–64 years old) make up 55.8% and seniors (over 64 years old) make up 23.9%.

As of 2000, there were 228 people who were single and never married in the municipality. There were 406 married individuals, 42 widows or widowers and 29 individuals who are divorced.

As of 2010, there were 83 households that consist of only one person and 22 households with five or more people. In 2000, a total of 283 apartments (85.0% of the total) were permanently occupied, while 44 apartments (13.2%) were seasonally occupied and 6 apartments (1.8%) were empty. In 2011, single family homes made up 75.0% of the total housing in the municipality.

The historical population is given in the following chart:

== Transport ==
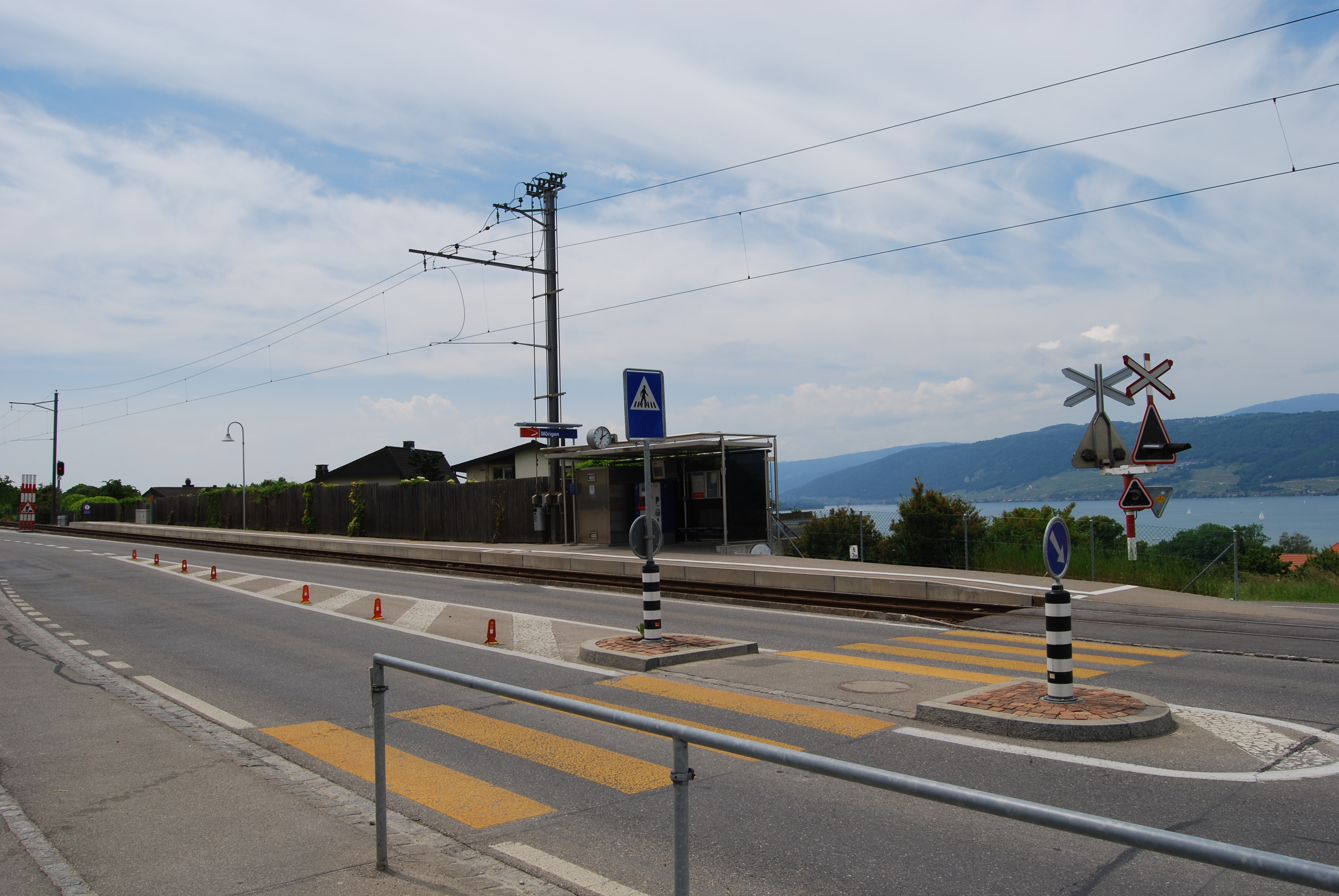
Train station of Mörigen

Mörigen owns over an Aare Seeland mobil trainstation.

== Politics ==
In the 2011 federal election the most popular party was the Swiss People's Party (SVP) which received 37.7% of the vote. The next three most popular parties were the FDP.The Liberals (18.5%), the Conservative Democratic Party (BDP) (17.9%) and the Social Democratic Party (SP) (9.5%). In the federal election, a total of 432 votes were cast, and the voter turnout was 63.2%.

== Economy ==
As of 2011, Mörigen had an unemployment rate of 1.17%. As of 2008, there were a total of 119 people employed in the municipality. Of these, there were 27 people employed in the primary economic sector and about 9 businesses involved in this sector. 28 people were employed in the secondary sector and there were 9 businesses in this sector. 64 people were employed in the tertiary sector, with 15 businesses in this sector. There were 367 residents of the municipality who were employed in some capacity, of which females made up 41.4% of the workforce.

In 2008 there were a total of 87 full-time equivalent jobs. The number of jobs in the primary sector was 17, all of which were in agriculture. The number of jobs in the secondary sector was 25 of which 17 or (68.0%) were in manufacturing and 8 (32.0%) were in construction. The number of jobs in the tertiary sector was 45. In the tertiary sector; 9 or 20.0% were in wholesale or retail sales or the repair of motor vehicles, 21 or 46.7% were in a hotel or restaurant, 6 or 13.3% were technical professionals or scientists, 6 or 13.3% were in education.

In 2000, there were 42 workers who commuted into the municipality and 297 workers who commuted away. The municipality is a net exporter of workers, with about 7.1 workers leaving the municipality for every one entering. A total of 70 workers (62.5% of the 112 total workers in the municipality) both lived and worked in Mörigen.

Of the working population, 14.4% used public transportation to get to work, and 67.3% used a private car.

In 2011 the average local and cantonal tax rate on a married resident, with two children, of Mörigen making 150,000 CHF was 11.6%, while an unmarried resident's rate was 17%. For comparison, the rate for the entire canton in the same year, was 14.2% and 22.0%, while the nationwide rate was 12.3% and 21.1% respectively. In 2009 there were a total of 399 tax payers in the municipality. Of that total, 201 made over 75,000 CHF per year. The average income of the over 75,000 CHF group in Mörigen was 165,527 CHF, while the average across all of Switzerland was 130,478 CHF.

In 2011 a total of 0.1% of the population received direct financial assistance from the government.

== Religion ==
From the 2000 census, 502 or 71.2% belonged to the Swiss Reformed Church, while 109 or 15.5% were Roman Catholic. Of the rest of the population, there were 6 members of an Orthodox church (or about 0.85% of the population), there was 1 individual who belongs to the Christian Catholic Church, and there was 1 individual who belongs to another Christian church. There was 1 individual who was Islamic. 63 (or about 8.94% of the population) belonged to no church, are agnostic or atheist, and 22 individuals (or about 3.12% of the population) did not answer the question.

== Education ==
In Mörigen about 58.8% of the population have completed non-mandatory upper secondary education, and 31.7% have completed additional higher education (either university or a Fachhochschule). Of the 165 who had completed some form of tertiary schooling listed in the census, 73.3% were Swiss men, 20.6% were Swiss women, 3.6% were non-Swiss men.

The Canton of Bern school system provides one year of non-obligatory Kindergarten, followed by six years of Primary school. This is followed by three years of obligatory lower Secondary school where the students are separated according to ability and aptitude. Following the lower Secondary students may attend additional schooling or they may enter an apprenticeship.

The primary school of the first to sixth grade is run together with that of Sutz-Lattrigen. One kindergarten class is taught in both communities. Depending on the school level, the children attend school either in Mörigen or in Sutz-Lattrigen. From the 7th to the 9th grade, the students attend school at the Oberstufenzentrum Täuffelen. The high school is located in Biel-Bienne.
