= Ipsach =

- Municipality
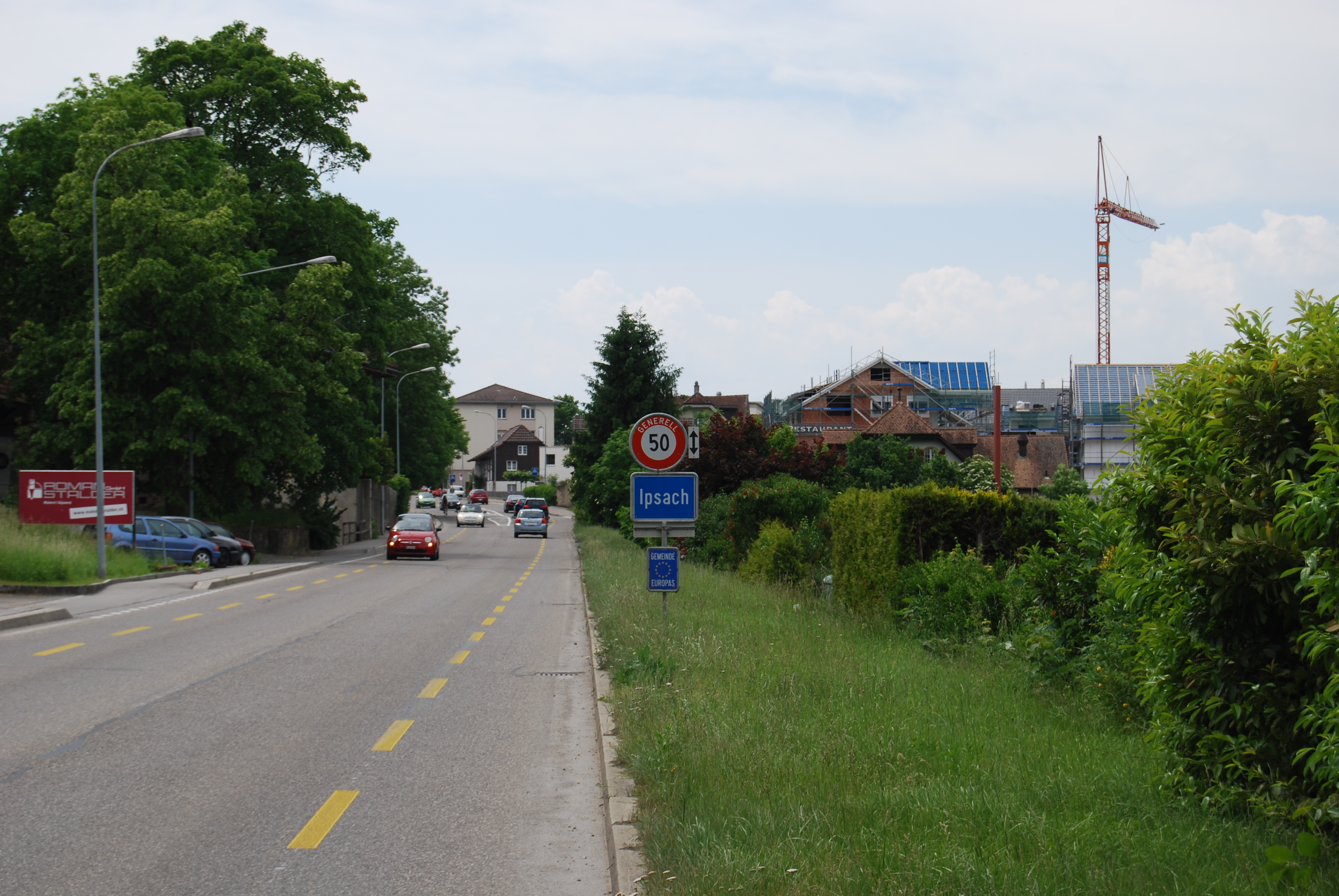
- Ipsach village

- Flag Coat of arms
- Location of Ipsach
- Location within Switzerland Location within Canton of Bern
- Coordinates: 47°7′N 7°14′E
- Country: Switzerland
- Canton: Bern
- District: Biel/Bienne

Government
  - Executive: Gemeinderat with 7 members
  - Mayor: Gemeindepräsident; Bernhard Bachmann SPS/PSS (as of 2026)

Area
  - Total: 1.9 km^{2} (0.73 sq mi)
- Elevation: 442 m (1,450 ft)

Population (Dec 2020)
  - Total: 3,913
  - Density: 2,100/km^{2} (5,300/sq mi)
- Time zone: UTC+01:00 (CET)
  - Summer (DST): UTC+02:00 (CEST)
- Postal code: 2563
- SFOS number: 739
- ISO 3166 code: CH-BE
- Surrounded by: Bellmund, Biel/Bienne, Nidau, Port, Sutz-Lattrigen, Tüscherz-Alfermée
- Website: www.ipsach.ch

Ipsach is a municipality in the Biel/Bienne administrative district in the canton of Bern in Switzerland.

== History ==
Ipsach is first mentioned around 1265-66 as Ipzacho.

The area around Ipsach was often settled during the Neolithic, Bronze Age and Hallstatt eras. The former bogs and peat moss near the village are full of prehistoric artifacts. During the Roman era, there was a small town near what is now Oberdorf-Buchseefeld and the remains of a Roman road to Petinesca has been discovered in the Ipsachmoos. By the Late Middle Ages there were two settlements in the area, the farm of Ipsach and the settlement of Wiler. The settlements were part of the Herrschaft of Nidau but St. Alban's Monastery in Basel also owned land and rights in Ipsach. In 1335, the owner of the Herrschaft, the Knight Cuno von Sutz sold Ipsach and Wiler to the Counts of Neuchâtel-Nidau. Ownership of the settlements were inherited by the town of Fribourg in 1382 and then passed to Bern in 1398. Under Bernese rule, Ipsach and Wiler were part of the bailiwick of Nidau. Over the following centuries the population of Wiler shrunk and by 1551 it was listed as just a farm. Soon thereafter it was completely abandoned and fell into ruin.

The inhabitants of the village farmed and fished in Lake Biel. The Jura water correction project of 1868-91 lowered the water level in the lake and opened up a strip of marshy land to agriculture. The village's location along the lake made it easy for residents to reach the towns of Biel and Neuchâtel. In 1916, the Biel-Täuffelen-Ins railroad further connected Ipsach to the surrounding towns. Beginning in the 1950s, Ipsach became a suburb of Biel and its population began to grow rapidly. In the 1980s a community center, a church and sport facilities were all built for the growing population. In 1989 it became the center of the Ipsach parish. Today many of the residents commute to jobs and schools in Nidau and Biel.

== Geography ==
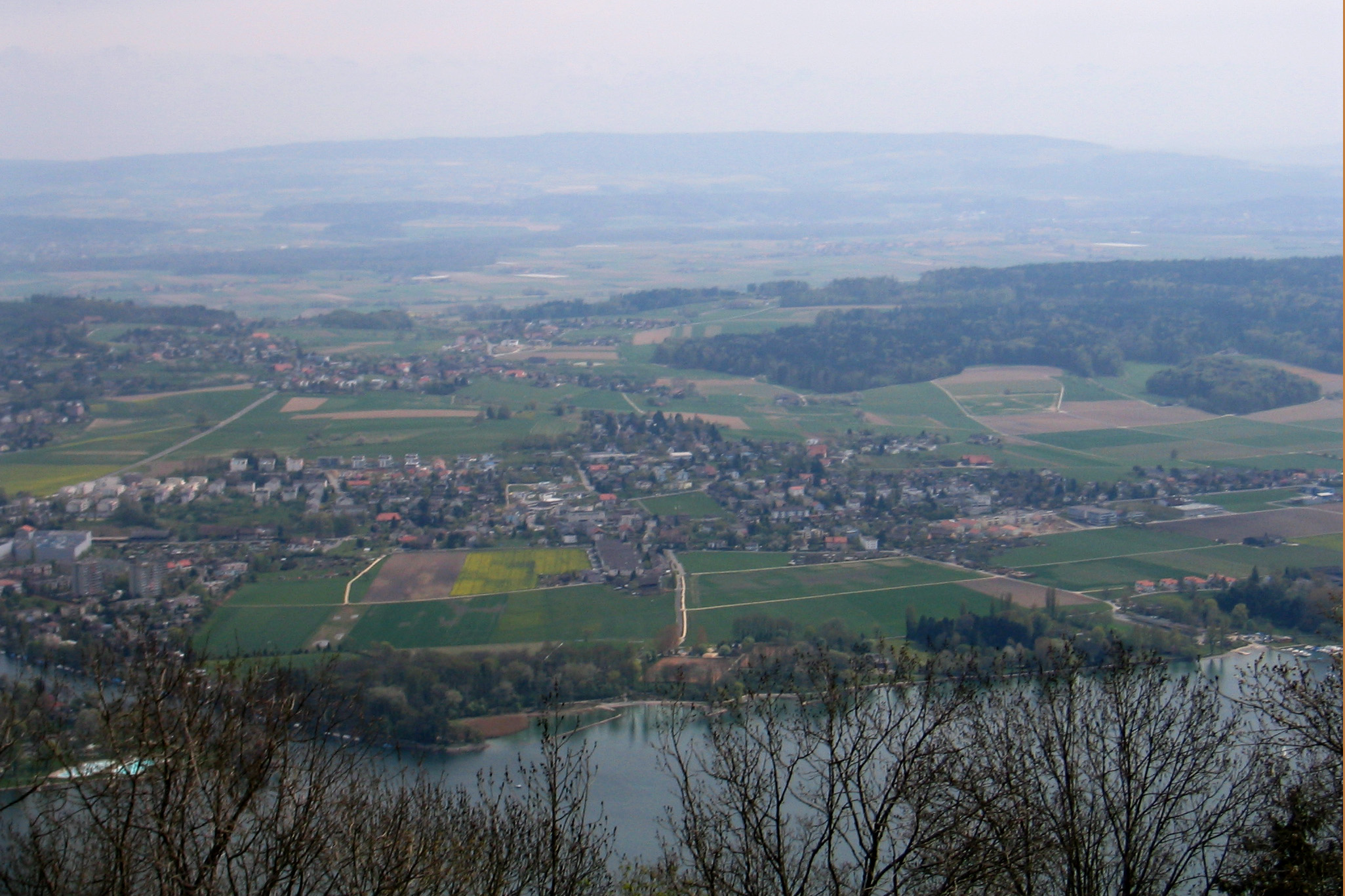
View of Ipsach in the center, with Bellmund in the background

Ipsach has an area of 1.9 km^{2} (0.73 sq mi). As of 2012, a total of 0.86 km^{2} (0.33 mi^{2}) or 45.0% is used for agricultural purposes, while 0.07 km^{2} (0.027 mi^{2}) or 3.7% is forested. Of the rest of the land, 0.96 km^{2} (0.37 mi^{2}) or 50.3% is settled (buildings or roads) and 0.01 km^{2} (2.5 acres) or 0.5% is unproductive land.

During the same year, industrial buildings made up 2.6% of the total area while housing and buildings made up 30.9% and transportation infrastructure made up 8.9%. while parks, green belts and sports fields made up 6.8%. Out of the forested land, all of the forested land area is covered with heavy forests. Of the agricultural land, 37.7% is used for growing crops and 6.3% is pastures.

The municipality is located along the right bank of Lake Biel.

On 31 December 2009 Amtsbezirk Nidau, the municipality's former district, was dissolved. On the following day, 1 January 2010, it joined the newly created Verwaltungskreis Biel/Bienne.

== Coat of arms ==
The blazon of the municipal coat of arms is Per fess Or a Sickle Azure fesswise and of the last a Perch naiant Argent.

== Demographics ==
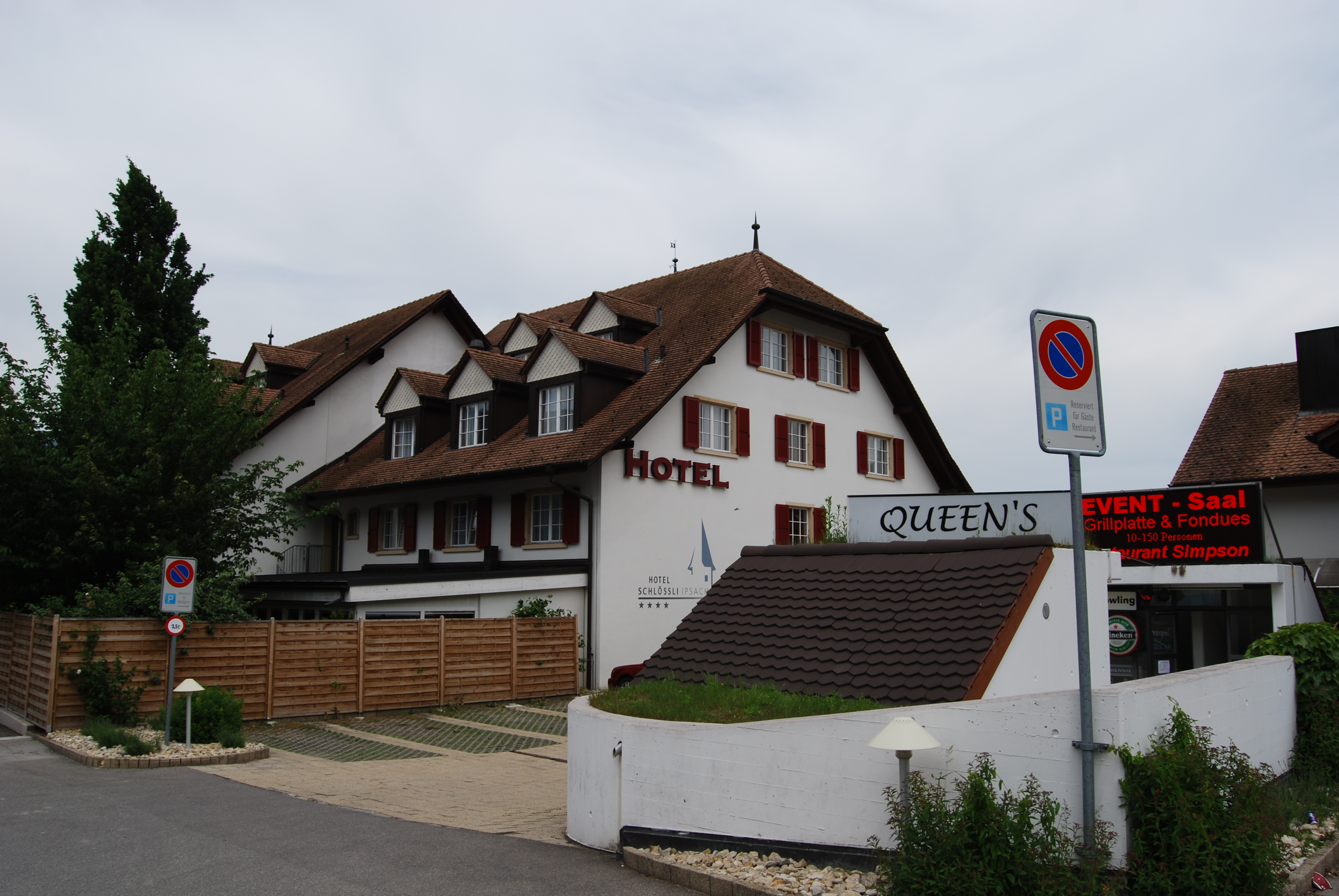
Hotel and buildings in Ipsach

Ipsach has a population (as of December 2020) of 3,913. As of 2010, 10.3% of the population are resident foreign nationals. Over the last 10 years (2001-2011) the population has changed at a rate of -0.4%. Migration accounted for -0.4%, while births and deaths accounted for 0.3%.

Most of the population (as of 2000) speaks German (2,837 or 86.9%) as their first language, French is the second most common (287 or 8.8%) and Italian is the third (34 or 1.0%). There are 2 people who speak Romansh.

As of 2008, the population was 49.8% male and 50.2% female. The population was made up of 1,738 Swiss men (44.4% of the population) and 210 (5.4%) non-Swiss men. There were 1,772 Swiss women (45.3%) and 19 (0.5%) non-Swiss women. Of the population in the municipality, 528 or about 16.2% were born in Ipsach and lived there in 2000. There were 1,548 or 47.4% who were born in the same canton, while 748 or 22.9% were born somewhere else in Switzerland, and 353 or 10.8% were born outside of Switzerland.

As of 2011, children and teenagers (0–19 years old) make up 21.2% of the population, while adults (20–64 years old) make up 59.2% and seniors (over 64 years old) make up 19.5%.

As of 2000, there were 1,219 people who were single and never married in the municipality. There were 1,683 married individuals, 150 widows or widowers and 214 individuals who are divorced.

As of 2010, there were 487 households that consist of only one person and 97 households with five or more people. In 2000, a total of 1,421 apartments (91.6% of the total) were permanently occupied, while 82 apartments (5.3%) were seasonally occupied and 48 apartments (3.1%) were empty. As of 2010, the construction rate of new housing units was 0.5 new units per 1000 residents. The vacancy rate for the municipality, in 2012, was 1.67%. In 2011, single family homes made up 60.8% of the total housing in the municipality.

The historical population is given in the following chart:

== Politics ==
In the 2011 federal election the most popular party was the Swiss People's Party (SVP) which received 29.6% of the vote. The next three most popular parties were the Social Democratic Party (SP) (22.7%), the Conservative Democratic Party (BDP) (14%) and the FDP.The Liberals (12.5%). In the federal election, a total of 1,477 votes were cast, and the voter turnout was 52.5%.

== Economy ==
As of 2011, Ipsach had an unemployment rate of 1.66%. As of 2008, there were a total of 612 people employed in the municipality. Of these, there were 21 people employed in the primary economic sector and about 5 businesses involved in this sector. 190 people were employed in the secondary sector and there were 21 businesses in this sector. 401 people were employed in the tertiary sector, with 84 businesses in this sector. There were 1,854 residents of the municipality who were employed in some capacity, of which females made up 43.6% of the workforce.

In 2008 there were a total of 520 full-time equivalent jobs. The number of jobs in the primary sector was 12, all of which were in agriculture. The number of jobs in the secondary sector was 174 of which 135 or (77.6%) were in manufacturing and 40 (23.0%) were in construction. The number of jobs in the tertiary sector was 334. In the tertiary sector; 104 or 31.1% were in wholesale or retail sales or the repair of motor vehicles, 5 or 1.5% were in the movement and storage of goods, 34 or 10.2% were in a hotel or restaurant, 16 or 4.8% were in the information industry, 40 or 12.0% were the insurance or financial industry, 40 or 12.0% were technical professionals or scientists, 26 or 7.8% were in education and 25 or 7.5% were in health care.

In 2000, there were 352 workers who commuted into the municipality and 1,583 workers who commuted away. The municipality is a net exporter of workers, with about 4.5 workers leaving the municipality for every one entering. A total of 271 workers (43.5% of the 623 total workers in the municipality) both lived and worked in Ipsach. Of the working population, 19.1% used public transportation to get to work, and 54.6% used a private car.

In 2011 the average local and cantonal tax rate on a married resident, with two children, of Ipsach making 150,000 CHF was 12%, while an unmarried resident's rate was 17.7%. For comparison, the rate for the entire canton in the same year, was 14.2% and 22.0%, while the nationwide rate was 12.3% and 21.1% respectively. In 2009 there were a total of 1,738 tax payers in the municipality. Of that total, 737 made over 75,000 CHF per year. There were 6 people who made between 15,000 and 20,000 per year. The average income of the over 75,000 CHF group in Ipsach was 124,310 CHF, while the average across all of Switzerland was 130,478 CHF.

In 2011 a total of 3.2% of the population received direct financial assistance from the government.

== Religion ==
From the 2000 census, 2,033 or 62.2% belonged to the Swiss Reformed Church, while 653 or 20.0% were Roman Catholic. Of the rest of the population, there were 8 members of an Orthodox church (or about 0.24% of the population), there were 5 individuals (or about 0.15% of the population) who belonged to the Christian Catholic Church, and there were 52 individuals (or about 1.59% of the population) who belonged to another Christian church. There was 1 individual who was Jewish, and 75 (or about 2.30% of the population) who were Islamic. There were 10 individuals who were Buddhist, 1 person who was Hindu and 1 individual who belonged to another church. 348 (or about 10.66% of the population) belonged to no church, are agnostic or atheist, and 79 individuals (or about 2.42% of the population) did not answer the question.

== Education ==
In Ipsach about 60.9% of the population have completed non-mandatory upper secondary education, and 22.5% have completed additional higher education (either university or a Fachhochschule). Of the 511 who had completed some form of tertiary schooling listed in the census, 74.4% were Swiss men, 16.6% were Swiss women, 5.9% were non-Swiss men and 3.1% were non-Swiss women.

The Canton of Bern school system provides one year of non-obligatory Kindergarten, followed by six years of Primary school. This is followed by three years of obligatory lower Secondary school where the students are separated according to ability and aptitude. Following the lower Secondary students may attend additional schooling or they may enter an apprenticeship.

During the 2011–12 school year, there were a total of 310 students attending classes in Ipsach. There were 4 kindergarten classes with a total of 86 students in the municipality. Of the kindergarten students, 11.6% were permanent or temporary residents of Switzerland (not citizens) and 19.8% have a different mother language than the classroom language. The municipality had 12 primary classes and 224 students. Of the primary students, 11.2% were permanent or temporary residents of Switzerland (not citizens) and 17.9% have a different mother language than the classroom language.

As of 2000, there were a total of 219 students attending any school in the municipality. Of those, 217 both lived and attended school in the municipality, while 2 students came from another municipality. During the same year, 213 residents attended schools outside the municipality.
