= Buell (surname) =

Buell is a surname. Notable people with the surname include:

- Abel Buell (1742–1822), goldsmith and counterfeiter in the American colonies
- Al Buell (1910–1996), American pin-up artist
- Alexander H. Buell (1801–1853), New York politician, U.S. congressman
- Alice Standish Buell (1892–1960), American artist and printmaker
- Augustus Caesar Buell (1847–1904), American author of several plagiarized and fabricated biographies
- Bebe Buell (born 1953), American fashion model and singer
- Caroline Brown Buell (1843–1927), American writer and temperance and suffrage activist
- Charles Buell (1900–1964), American football player and educator
- Dai Buell (1892–1939), American pianist and teacher
- Don Carlos Buell (1818–1898), Union general during the American Civil War
- Dorothy Richardson Buell (1886–1976), American educator and nature preservationist
- Erik Buell (born 1950), American motorcycle racer, designer, and the founder of Buell Motorcycle Company
- George P. Buell (1833–1893), American civil engineer and soldier
- Hal Buell (born ?), American photojournalist and photo archivist
- Jacob Dockstader Buell (1827–1894), Canadian lawyer and politician
- Jaxon Buell (2014–2020), American child who outlived expectations with about 20% of a normal brain
- Jed Buell (1897–1961), American film producer, director, and screenwriter
- Lawrence Buell (academic) (born 1939), American literature professor, literary critic, and pioneer in ecocriticism
- Lawrence Buell (politician) (born 1934), American politician
- Marjorie Henderson Buell (1904–1993; see: Marge (cartoonist)), American cartoonist publishing under the pen name "Marge"
- Martin T. Buell (1942–2023), American martial arts black belt and instructor
- Mary Van Rensselaer Buell (1893–1969), American biochemist, and nutrition and physiological chemistry researcher
- Monty Buell (born ?), American history and philosophy professor
- Murray Fife Buell (1905–1975), American plant ecologist
- Pop Buell (1913–1980), American humanitarian aid worker in Laos
- Presendia Huntington Buell (1810–1892; see: List of Joseph Smith's wives)
- Robert Buell, several people
- Ryan Buell (born 1982), American paranormal investigator
- Ryan W. Buell (born ?), American business academic
- Samuel W. Buell (born ?), American law professor
- Sarah Josepha Hale (also known as Sarah Josepha Buell Hale; 1788–1879), American writer, activist, and editor
- Susie Tompkins Buell (born 1943), American businesswoman, entrepreneur, and progressive donor
- Temple Hoyne Buell (1895–1990), American architect
- William Buell (1751–1832), American born Canadian jurist, miller, and politician
- William Buell Jr. (1792–1862), Canadian journalist and politician
- William M. Buell (1810–1869), American politician
- Willis Buell (also spelled Wyllys; 1790–1851), American politician and judge

Fictional characters:

- Judge Buell, character in the Judge Dredd comic strip
