= Lewis S. Hills House =

Lewis S. Hills House may refer to:

- Lewis S. Hills House (425 E. 100 South), Salt Lake City, Utah, listed on the NRHP in Salt Lake City, Utah
- Lewis S. Hills House (126 S. 200 West), Salt Lake City, Utah, listed on the NRHP in Utah

== See also ==
- Hills House (disambiguation)
