= Buell =

Buell may refer to:

== People ==
- Buell (surname)
- Buell (given name)

== Places ==
- Buell, Missouri, United States, an unincorporated community
- Buell Peak, Washington state, United States
- Buell Peninsula, Victoria Land, Antarctica
- Buell Seamount, in the Atlantic Ocean

== Other uses ==
- Buell Elementary School, in Mount Morris Township, Michigan, site of a school shooting in 2000
- Buell Children's Museum, Pueblo, Colorado, United States
- Buell Hall, a building on the campus of Columbia University
- Buell Motorcycle Company, a former motorcycle manufacturer based in East Troy, Wisconsin
- Erik Buell Racing, a company that makes racing motorcycles that is based in East Troy, Wisconsin

== See also ==
- Buel (disambiguation)
- Temple Buell College, a former name of Colorado Women's College
