= Cherry Creek Shopping Center =

Coordinates: 39.716710°N 104.953140°W

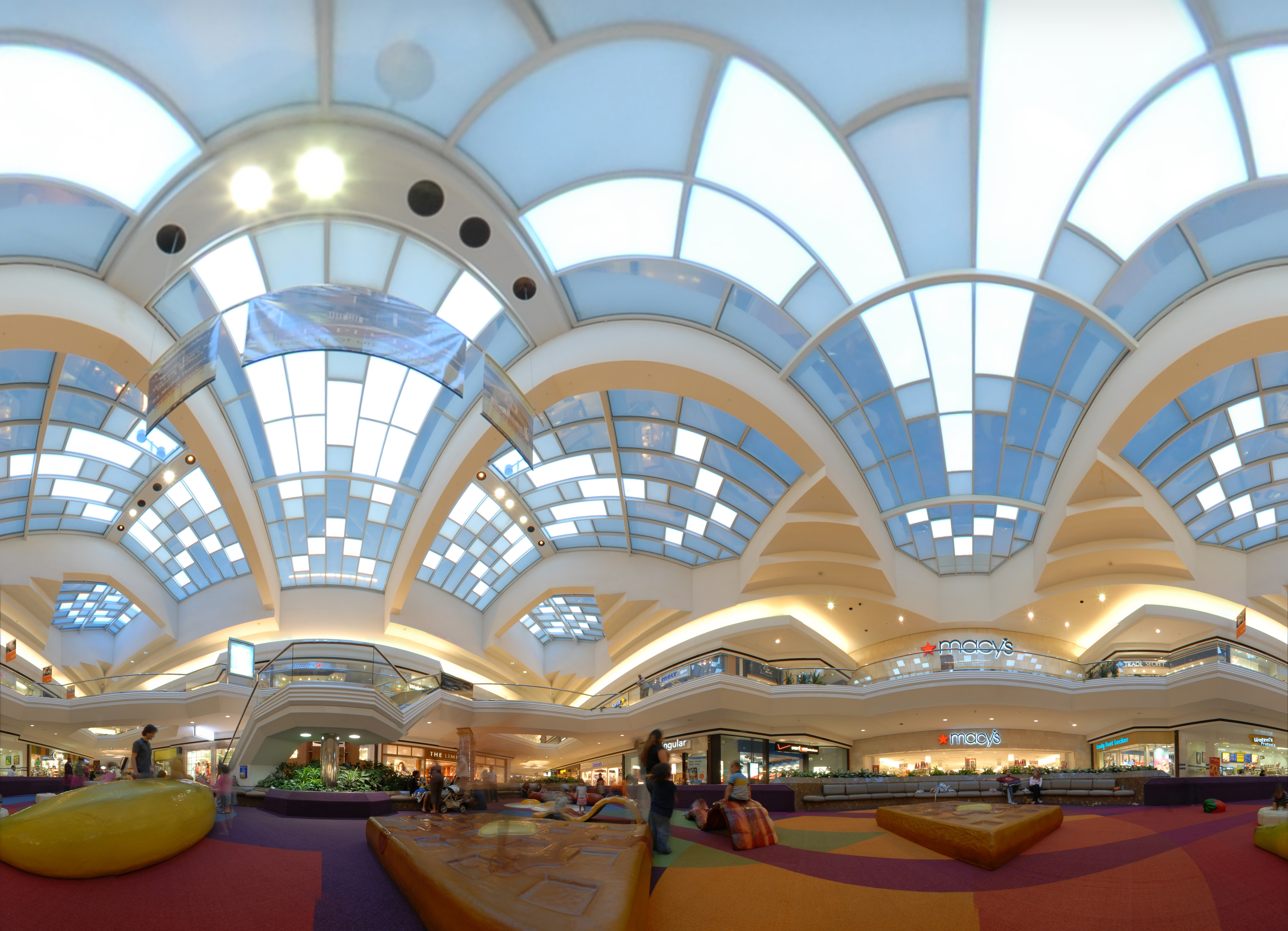
- Cherry Creek Center atrium and playground in 2007
- Location: Denver, Colorado
- Management: Simon Property Group
- Owner: Simon Property Group
- Stores: 160+
- Anchor tenants: 4
- Floor area: 1,032,000 sq ft (95,900 m^{2})
- Floors: 2
- Website: www.simon.com/mall/cherry-creek-shopping-center

Cherry Creek Shopping Center, also known as Cherry Creek Center, is a shopping mall about 3 1/2 miles southeast of downtown Denver, Colorado in the Cherry Creek Neighborhood. It is situated along East First Avenue on the banks of Cherry Creek. The mall features Macy's, Nordstrom, Restoration Hardware, and Neiman Marcus.

Cherry Creek Center was originally completed in 1953, and was renovated in 1990, currently anchored by three department stores; Neiman Marcus, Macy's, and Nordstrom. Lord & Taylor opened a location at the mall in 1990, a newer expanded store closed in 2004 after the chain repositioned. Other than the shops in Aspen, Cherry Creek Center is the exclusive location of several luxury retailers in Colorado, such as Louis Vuitton, Burberry, and Brooks Brothers. Saks Fifth Avenue closed in March 2011 and became Restoration Hardware in 2015.

It is also home to an eight screen movie theater operated by AMC. The mall is operated by Simon Property Group, which acquired former operator Taubman Realty Group.

== Before the shopping center ==
The shopping center is a triumph of mined land reclamation. In the 1920's Temple Buell bought a large parcel of land at First Avenue and University Boulevard. It was nothing but a weed-filled area. Before the shopping center, sand was mined from a large pit. After it was mined out, the city used the pit as a sanitary landfill in the 1940s. After the pit was filled with trash, the first Cherry Creek shopping center was built over the dump. It was designed in 1949 by Temple Hoyne Buell and is still in use, located immediately west of the larger mall facility extension renovated in 1990. The former location of Bed Bath & Beyond was originally the Cherry Creek location of The Denver Dry Goods Company/May-Daniels & Fisher until 1990.

== Department stores and anchors ==
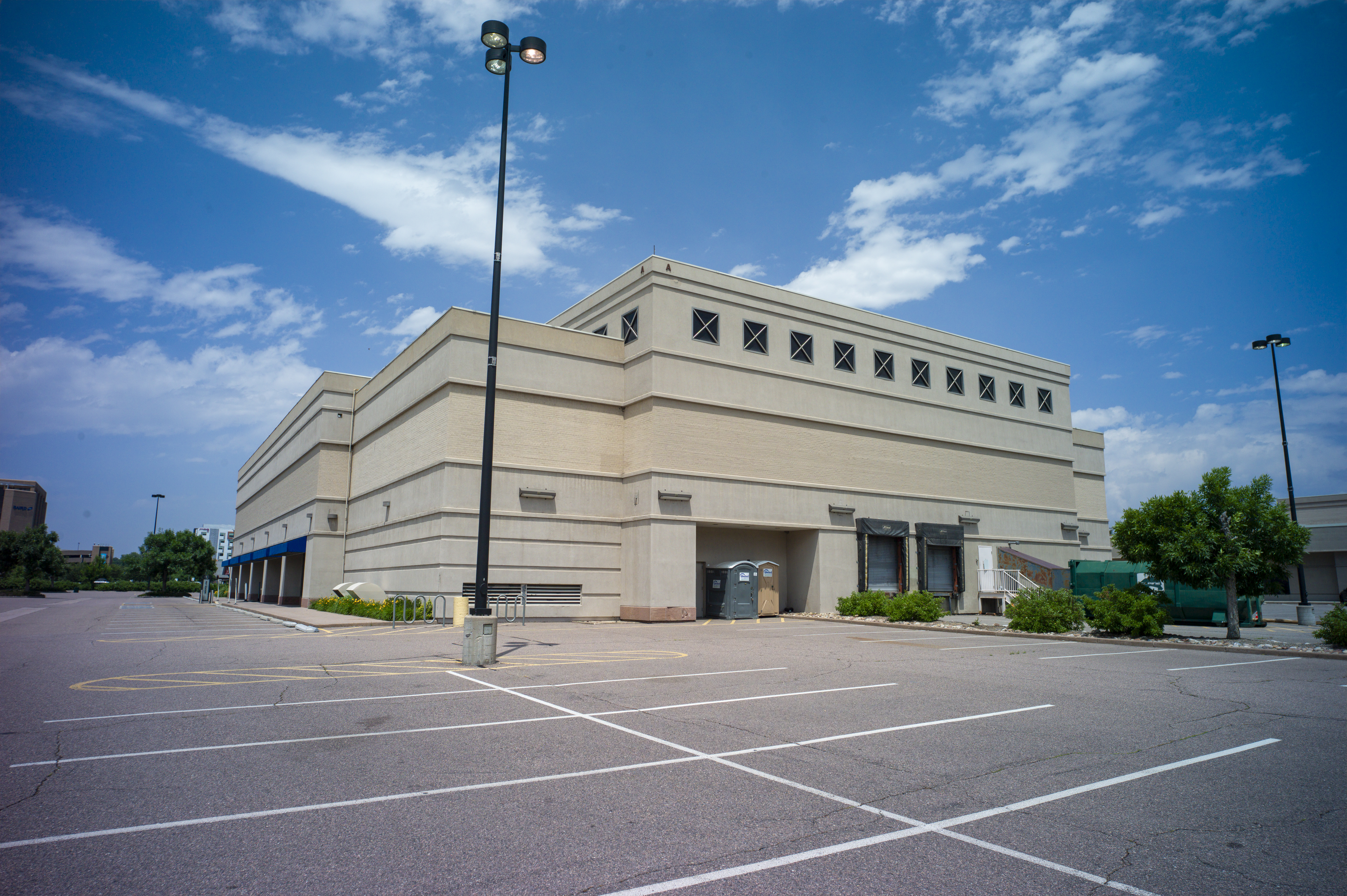
Vacant Denver Dry Building, first Cherry Creek mall

- Nordstrom - (Opened 2007 in former Lord & Taylor location)
- Macy's - (Originally to be new location for The Denver Dry Goods store, merged with and opened as May D&F merged with Foley's, became Macy's in 2006)
- Restoration Hardware - (Opened 1990 as Saks Fifth Avenue, closed 2011, demolished, site became Restoration Hardware in 2015)
- Neiman Marcus - (Opened 1991)

== Former department stores and anchors ==
- Lord & Taylor - (Opened in 1990, closed 2005, became Nordstrom in 2007)
- Saks Fifth Avenue - (Opened in 1990, closed in 2011, demolished, site became Restoration Hardware in 2015)
