= Denver Symphony Orchestra =

American orchestra

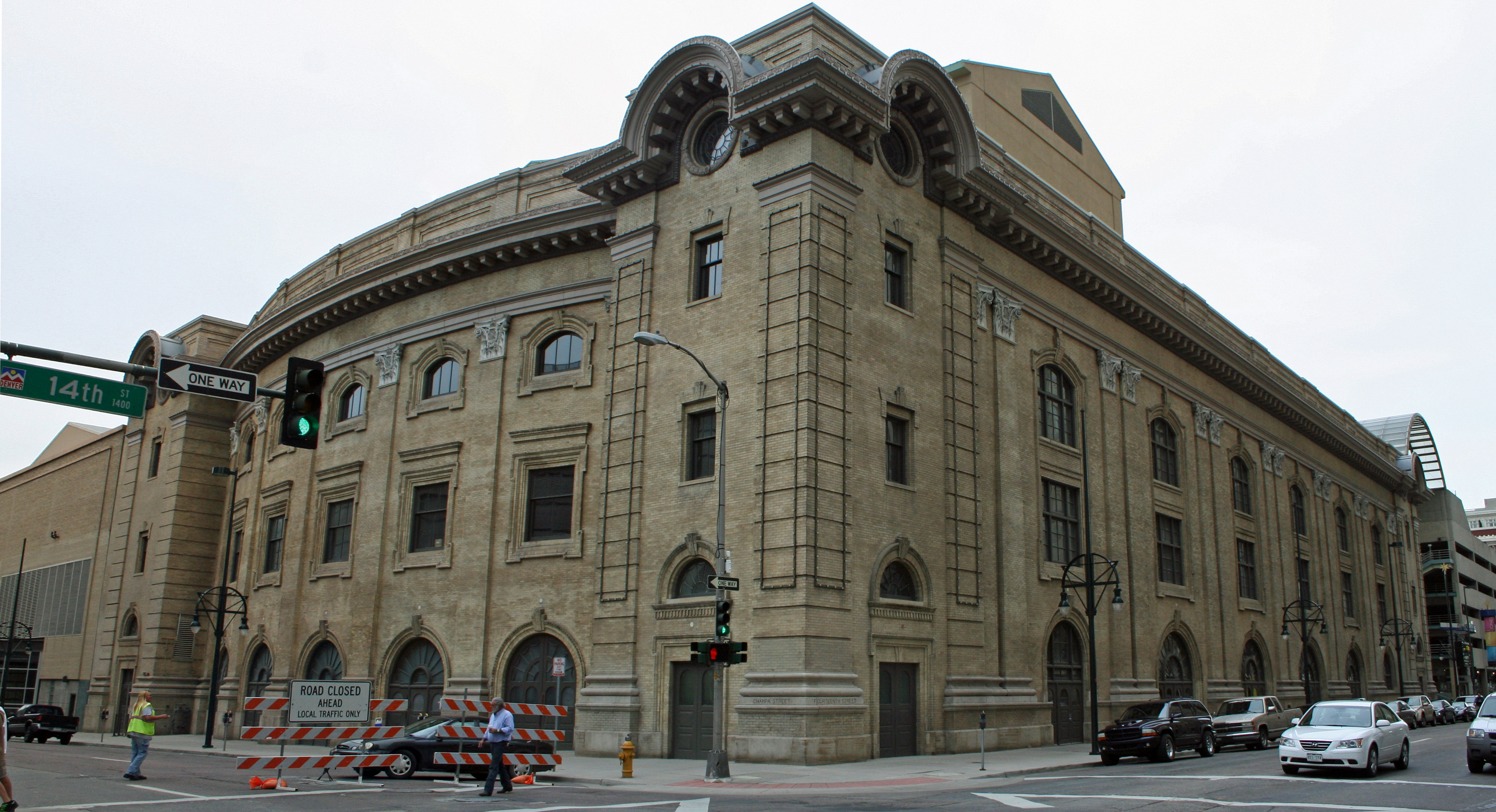
The Denver Municipal Auditorium, located at 1323 Champa Street in Denver, Colorado. The building is now (2005- ) called the Ellie Caulkins Opera House, and the main entrance is now on the other side of the building.

The Denver Symphony Orchestra, established in 1934 and dissolved in 1989, was a professional American orchestra in Denver, Colorado. Until 1978, when the Boettcher Concert Hall was built to house the symphony orchestra, it performed in a succession of theaters, amphitheaters, and auditoriums. It was the predecessor to the Colorado Symphony, although the two ensembles were legally and structurally separate.

== Founding and early period ==
A community ensemble called the Civic Symphony Orchestra had been formed in Denver in 1922. During the Great Depression, the orchestra struggled to pay its musicians and find paying customers. In 1934 Helen Marie Black, the symphony's volunteer publicist, Jeanne Cramner, and Lucille Wilkin founded the Denver Symphony Orchestra to consolidate all the musicians in the city and guarantee union wages. In 1935 they founded the Denver Symphony Guild to develop projects and fundraise for the orchestra. Black served as the Denver Symphony Orchestra's business manager for more than 30 years, twelve of them as an unpaid volunteer. She was the first female symphony manager in the United States.

The orchestra's first concert was offered on November 30, 1934, at Denver's Broadway Theatre. Its Tuesday-night concerts were usually performed in the Municipal Auditorium. Both the community and professional orchestras were maintained through the 1946–47 season. Conductor Horace Tureman led both until his 1944 retirement due to illness.

In 1945, Saul Caston, who had been associate conductor of the Philadelphia Orchestra under both Leopold Stokowski and Eugene Ormandy, was hired as the Denver Symphony's conductor and music director. Caston was married to the soprano Selma Amansky and built the orchestra significantly during his tenure, through touring, school performances, low-priced family ticket plans, and outdoor performances at the Red Rocks Amphitheatre, west of Denver. A 1951 Time article documented his leadership, declaring, "Last season the Denver Symphony was among the leaders in performing American music".

In 1938, Sergei Prokofiev conducted the orchestra in his First Symphony; and performed as a pianist on his First Piano Concerto under the baton of Horace Tureman. The performance was hampered by Prokofiev's demeanor, poor printings of the scores, and insufficient rehearsal time, and pleased neither reviewers nor Prokofiev. During the 1950s, under Saul Caston's direction, Jascha Heifetz, Rudolf Serkin, Gregor Piatigorsky and Leon Fleischer were among the symphony's guest artists.

By the early 1960s, Saul Caston was losing the support of some musicians and members of the community. He was replaced in 1964 by Vladimir Golschmann, former conductor of the St. Louis Symphony, followed in 1970 by Brian Priestman, previously music director of the Royal Shakespeare Theatre, the Edmonton Symphony, and the Baltimore Symphony.

== The Priestman, Delogu eras ==
Under Brian Priestman, the orchestra experienced artistic and financial success, along with strong community support. They toured with guest conductors, including Carmen Dragon and Henry Mancini. Denver's commercial classical radio station and the May D&F department store conducted an annual, weekend-long fundraising event, setting up a broadcast studio and performance space in the windows of the downtown store.

In 1972, Denver voters approved a bond issue to build a new performance space specifically for the symphony, and Boettcher Concert Hall opened in 1978, the first U.S. symphony hall to be built in the round.

Sixten Ehrling was appointed principal guest conductor in 1978, and Gaetano Delogu became music director and conductor in 1979. Concert pianist and former music director of the New Orleans Symphony, Philippe Entremont, became principal conductor in 1986 and music director in 1988.

== Labor and financial difficulties ==
A series of labor disputes began in the late 1970s, forcing a 9-week delay of the 1977 season. The 1980 season start was delayed for twelve weeks. Other financial difficulties began to mount, and significant losses were incurred in the 1984 summer outdoor season due to unusually wet weather. In 1986, the musicians agreed to a 20% pay cut.

In 1988, the first three weeks of the season were cancelled for financial reasons. During the season, the board chairperson, the executive director, and music director Entremont all resigned. In March, 1989, immediately after the annual Marathon fund-raising weekend, the Symphony Association cancelled the remainder of the season. It filed for bankruptcy on October 4. In May 1990, the Denver Symphony Association merged with the newly formed Colorado Symphony Association, which formed the Colorado Symphony, a new and initially smaller orchestra employing many of the Denver Symphony musicians.

The Denver Symphony Orchestra performed its final concert March 25, 1989.

== Conductors and directors ==
| Horace Tureman | Conductor | 1934–44 |
| Saul Caston | Music Director | 1945–64 |
| Vladimir Golschmann | Music Director | 1964–69 |
| Brian Priestman | Music Director | 1970–79 |
| Sixten Ehrling | Principal Guest Conductor | 1978–79 |
| Gaetano Delogu | Music Director | 1979–80 |
| Philippe Entremont | Principal Conductor | 1986–88 |
| | Music Director | 1988–89 |
