= Helen Marie Black =

American journalist

- Born: June 2, 1896; Washington, D.C.
- Died: January 31, 1988 (aged 91); Denver, Colorado
- Occupations: Cultural and civic leader, journalist, publicist
- Known for: Co-founder and business manager of the Denver Symphony Orchestra
- Awards: Colorado Women's Hall of Fame, 1991

Helen Marie Black (June 2, 1896 – January 31, 1988) was an American cultural and civic leader, journalist, and publicist. She was a co-founder of the Denver Symphony Orchestra and served as its business manager for more than 30 years, being the first female symphony manager in the United States. She was posthumously inducted into the Colorado Women's Hall of Fame in 1991.

== Early life and education ==
Helen Marie Black was born in Washington, D.C. to Henry Mortimer Black, a mining engineer, and his wife, Palma Lanier Black. She had a brother and a sister. Her mother, who had a medical degree from Johns Hopkins University, nurtured her love of music, literature, and the arts. After Helen's birth, the family relocated first to New York City and then to Chicago, where her father established a brokerage firm. Several years later they moved again to Utah, where her father invested all his savings in a mineral wax mine near Salt Lake City. When the investment collapsed, her parents separated and her mother took the children to Denver. There Helen attended the Manual High School and North High School, graduating at the age of 16.

== Career ==
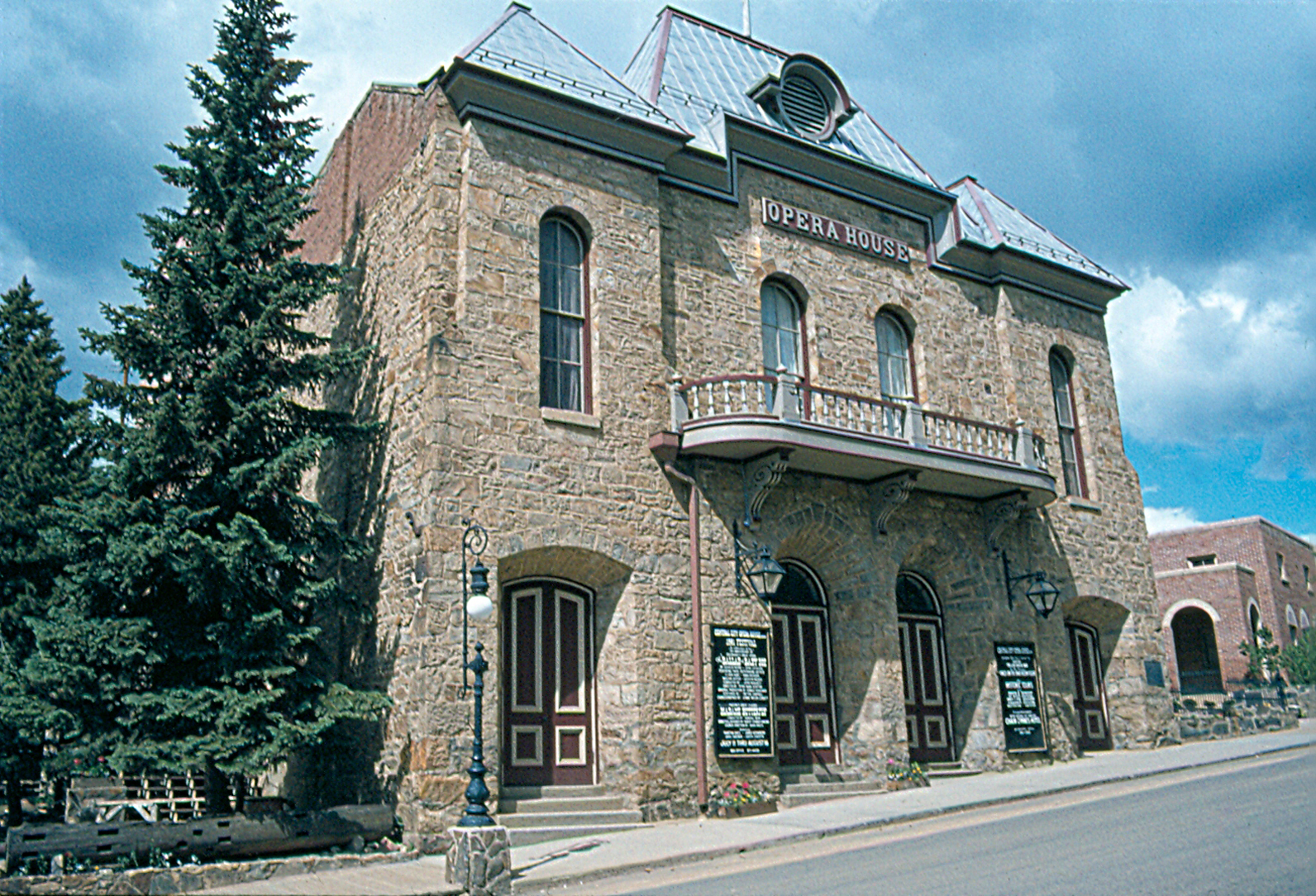
Central City Opera House, a National Historic Landmark

While Black intended to pursue a college degree in journalism, she was hired as an assistant to the society editor of the Rocky Mountain News right after graduation. She soon asked to move to the news department, where she covered the Denver visit of Aimee Semple McPherson in 1921. After her first interview was well-received, she arranged publicity stunts to show off the evangelist's skills, such as inviting more than 100 hospital patients to a church to be healed by McPherson, and reenacting the Sermon on the Mount with McPherson preaching on Lookout Mountain west of Denver. Black was next promoted to features writer, in which capacity she interviewed Charles Lindbergh, Helen Keller, Harry Houdini, and Queen Marie of Romania. She subsequently took on the post of music and drama editor and critic.

Following a hospitalization in 1926, Black quit the paper and became a publicist and fashion show coordinator for the Denver Dry Goods Company. She then moved to the Daniels & Fisher department store as a publicity assistant. It was during this period that she encouraged Anne Evans and other women to restore the Central City Opera House, and helped found the Central City Opera Association. She volunteered as a publicist for the Opera's annual summer festival.

The 1930s found the Denver Civic Symphony struggling for patrons and paying its musicians $5 per concert. Black, who had begun volunteering as the symphony's publicist in 1932, joined with Jeanne Cramner and Lucille Wilkin to create one musician's organization in the city and pay union salaries. In 1934 they founded the Denver Symphony Orchestra, and the following year established the Denver Symphony Guild as a fundraising arm. Black assumed the management of the orchestra, thus becoming the first female symphony manager in the United States. She remained the sole female symphony manager until 1951. She managed the orchestra, as well as handled publicity, scheduling, and staging productions, as an unpaid volunteer for the first 12 years of her tenure. In 1945 she left her job at Daniels & Fisher to become the full-time business manager of the orchestra.

Black applied her publicist's talents to her management of the orchestra. For example, during a 1947 orchestra tour at Red Rocks featuring soloist Lily Pons, who "sang like a bird", Black summoned a Life photographer to the concert and released a flock of pigeons around Pons' head when she hit a high note. That publicity stunt gained nationwide exposure.

Black resigned from the orchestra in 1964 after weathering ten years of a campaign to oust orchestra director Saul Caston, whom she had hired in 1944. She spent her retirement years engaged in volunteer work.

== Awards and honors ==
Black received numerous awards in her later years, including Woman of the Year from the Business and Professional Women's Club, Advertising Woman of the Year, and Beautiful Activist of Colorado from the Altrusa Clubs of Colorado. She received an honorary degree in humane letters from Metropolitan State College in 1984.

The Denver Women's Press Club and the Rocky Mountain News honored her with a September 26, 1983 black-tie dinner at which the annual Helen Marie Black Arts and Letters Award was launched. The Denver Foundation also endowed the Helen Marie Black Music Education Fund in her name.

Black was posthumously inducted into the Colorado Women's Hall of Fame in 1991.

== Death and legacy ==
Black never married. She died on January 31, 1988, in Denver at the age of 91.

In 2001 the Helen Marie Black Music Education Fund published a retrospective of her life in the book A Woman for All Seasons: Helen Marie Black, heart of the Denver Symphony Orchestra by Eva Hodges Watt.

== Sources ==
- Varnell, Jeanne (1999). Women of Consequence: The Colorado Women's Hall of Fame. Big Earth Publishing. ISBN 1555662145.
- Watt, Eva Hodges (2001). A Woman for All Seasons: Helen Marie Black, heart of the Denver Symphony Orchestra. Helen Marie Black Music Education Fund.
