= Thomas Hillhouse =

Thomas Hillhouse may refer to:

- Thomas Hillhouse (American politician) (1817–1897), American farmer, banker and politician
- Thomas P. Hillhouse (1898–1991), Canadian politician
- Thomas A. Hill House, a 19th-century house in Bangor, Maine, U.S.

== See also ==
- Thomas Hall House, a 19th-century house in Christiansburg, Virginia, U.S.
- Hillhouse (disambiguation)
