= Hills House =

Hills House or Hills Farm may refer to:

- Edward R. Hills House, a Frank Lloyd Wright-designed house in Oak Park, Illinois
- Hills House (Hudson, New Hampshire), listed on the National Register of Historic Places (NRHP)
- Hills House, Denham, a Tudor era residence in Buckinghamshire, England
- Ebenezer Hills, Jr., Farmhouse, Colonie, New York, NRHP-listed
- Stewart-Hills House, Orem Utah, NRHP-listed
- Lewis S. Hills House (425 E. 100 South), Salt Lake City, Utah, NRHP-listed
- Lewis S. Hills House (126 S. 200 West), Salt Lake City, Utah, NRHP-listed
- Hills Farm (Greenbush, Virginia), NRHP-listed
