= Fuell =

Fuell is a surname. Notable people with the surname include:

- Donald Fuell (born 1938), American football player
- John Fuell (by 1523–73/75), English Member of Parliament

== See also ==
- Buell (surname)
- Fell (surname)
