= La Maison Française =

La Maison Francaise may refer to the following buildings:

- Buell Hall, a building at Columbia University
- La Maison Française (Nazareth College)
- La Maison Française (New York University)
- La Maison Francaise (Rockefeller Center)

== See also ==
- Maison française d'Oxford, England
