= Gene Kloss =

American painter (1903–1996)

- Born: Alice Geneva Glasier; July 27, 1903; Oakland, California, U.S.
- Died: June 24, 1996 (aged 92); Taos, New Mexico, U.S.
- Education: University of California, Berkeley; California School of Fine Arts; California College of Arts and Crafts
- Known for: Etching, oil and watercolor painting
- Spouse: Phillips Kloss
- Elected: National Academy of Design, Academician (1972)

Alice Geneva "Gene" Kloss (née Glasier; July 27, 1903 – June 24, 1996) was an American artist known today primarily for her many prints of the Western landscape and ceremonies of the Pueblo people she drew entirely from memory.

== Early life and education ==
Alice Geneva Glasier was born in Oakland, California, on July 27, 1903. She resided with her Michigan-born father, who was president of a local creamery, her Illinois-born mother, and two older siblings, Harold and Eunice. It was at the local Plymouth Congregational Church where she met the minister’s son, her future husband Phillips W. Kloss, who was a poet and composer.

In 1921 she began her studies in the Department of Art at the University of California, Berkeley, where she perfected her skills as a painter under Ray Boynton and was first introduced to printmaking by the renowned etcher, Perham Wilhelm Nahl. Gene sketched and exhibited with the large art colony in Carmel-by-the Sea, California, and until 1938 periodically rented a cottage there for several months in the summer.

After she graduated in 1924 with "honors in art," she briefly studied at the California School of Fine Arts (today’s San Francisco Art Institute), and exhibited her etchings at the California Society of Etchers (today’s California Society of Printmakers) and at the Oakland Art Gallery. She married on May 25, 1925 and honeymooned for two months in the Southwest, her first exposure to that region. That fall she exhibited her etchings of the Bay Area, Carmel and Taos at Gump's Gallery in San Francisco.

Her first major one-person exhibition, which included almost 100 etchings, oils, watercolors, block prints and monotypes, at the Berkeley League of Fine Arts in March 1926 was so popular that it was extended for a month. This was the start of a career which included over 70 exhibitions in the Bay Area, where her watercolors were as popular with critics as her etchings.

== New Mexico ==
During their honeymoon in 1925 the Klosses visited Phillips’ brother in Las Cruces, New Mexico and also traveled to Santa Fe and Taos. It was not until 1960, when Phillips’ mother died, that they made Taos their permanent home. Prior to that time the couple habitually spent 2 to 4 months annually at the Taos art colony and lived the remainder of each year at the Kloss family home, either in Oakland or Berkeley, with visits to Carmel. From 1929 to 1938 they rented an old adobe below the Sangre de Cristo Mountains in Taos and equipped it with a second-hand Sturges etching press. During World War II Phillips worked in a local shipyard near Oakland. In February 1951 the couple completed construction on their spacious Berkeley hills studio-home designed by the architect Frederick Reimers.

Beginning in the mid-1930s Gene began to exhibit with some frequency in the Midwest and on the East Coast, including the Museum of Modern Art in New York City, as well as in the Southwest. In July 1935 she was one of five artists in an all-women’s show at the Rio Grande Art Gallery in Santa Fe. In addition to her many medals received at California Society of Etchers in San Francisco, she was awarded the Eyre Gold Medal for her etching ‘’Eve of the Green Corn Ceremony" at the Pennsylvania Academy of Fine Arts Annual in October 1936. In 1938 a wide selection of her work appeared at the Harwood Museum of Art in Taos and at the University of New Mexico. She also won awards at the Society of American Graphic Artists in New York and at the Chicago Society of Etchers. In 1950 she was elected an Associate (A.N.A.) of the National Academy of Design, submitting as the requirement for admission her drypoint ‘’Self Portrait and the Golden Gate"; she was elevated to the rank of National Academician (N.A.) in 1972. Between 1924 and 1981 Gene created about 630 etchings.

== Great Depression ==
Kloss received widespread recognition and awards during the 1930s. From 1933 to 1944 Kloss was the sole etcher employed by the Public Works of Art Project. Her series of nine New Mexico scenes from that period were reproduced and distributed to public schools across the state. She also created watercolors and oil paintings for the WPA. In 1935, she was one of three Taos artists who represented New Mexico at a Paris exhibition called "Three Centuries of Art in the United States".

== Solo exhibitions ==
- Berkeley Art League, Berkeley, California (1926)
- Oakland Gallery, Oakland, California (1932)
- Crocker Gallery, Sacramento, California (1939)
- Smithsonian Institution, Washington, D.C. (1945)
- Taos Art Association, Taos, New Mexico (1958)
- New Mexico Museum of Art, Santa Fe, New Mexico (1960)
- Birger Sandzen Memorial Museum, Lindsborg, Kansas (1966)
- Muckenthaler Cultural Center, Fullerton, California (1980)
- Corcoran Gallery of Art, Washington, D.C. (1988)
- Harwood Museum of Art, Taos, New Mexico (1994)

== Public collections ==
- Sangre de Cristo Arts and Conference Center in Pueblo, Colorado
- Metropolitan Museum of Art in New York City
- Smithsonian American Art Museum in Washington, D.C.
- Library of Congress
- Pennsylvania Academy of the Fine Arts in Philadelphia, Pennsylvania
- National Academy of Design
- San Francisco Museum of Modern Art
- New Mexico Museum of Art in Santa Fe, New Mexico
- Denver Art Museum
- Art Institute of Chicago
- Dallas Art Museum
- Honolulu Academy of Art
- New York Public Library
- Spencer Museum of Art in Lawrence, Kansas
- Gilcrease Museum in Tulsa, Oklahoma
