= Robert Buell =

Robert Buell may refer to:

- Robert Anthony Buell (1940–2002), American murderer
- Robert C. Buell (1931–2018), American politician

== See also ==
- Buell (disambiguation)
