= Bloomingdale Insane Asylum =

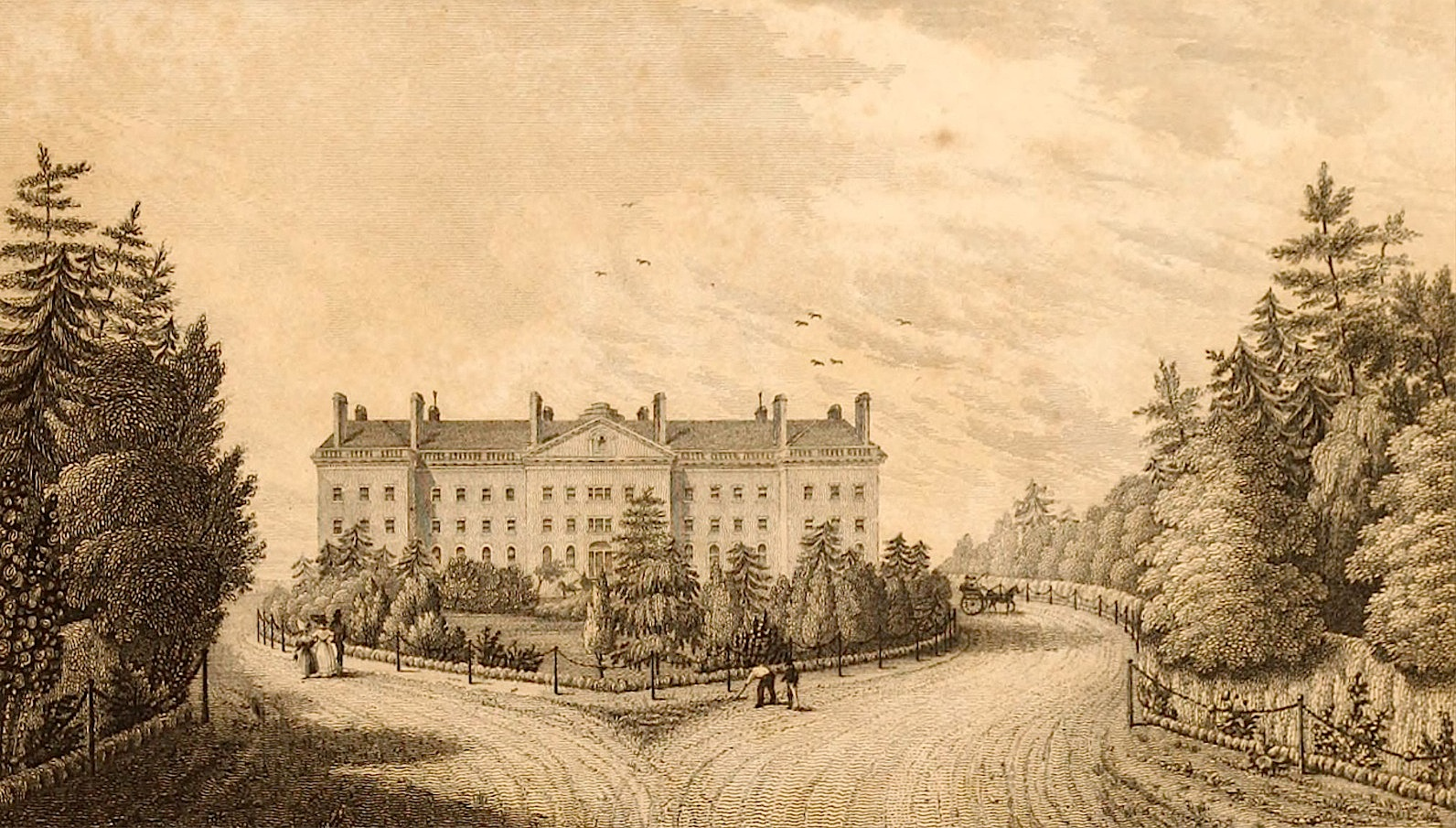
- Bloomingdale Insane Asylum c. 1831

Geography
- Location: Morningside Heights, Manhattan, New York, United States
- Coordinates: 40°48′31″N 73°57′41″W

Links
- Lists: Hospitals in New York State
- Other links: Hospitals in Manhattan

The Bloomingdale Insane Asylum (1821–1889) was an American private hospital for the care of the mentally ill, founded by New York Hospital. It was located in the Morningside Heights neighborhood of Manhattan in New York City, where Columbia University is now located. It relocated to White Plains, New York, as the Payne Whitney Psychiatric Clinic, now known as the "NewYork-Presbyterian Westchester Behavioral Health Center."

The road leading to the asylum from the thriving city of New York (at the time consisting only of lower Manhattan) was called Bloomingdale Road in the 19th century, and is now called Broadway. The term "Bloomingdale" dates back to the era of Dutch rule in New Amsterdam, and is possibly a reference to "Bloemendaal," the name of a small village in the flower-growing region near Haarlem in the Netherlands. Bloomingdale is described as being a small village on the island, in Spafford's Gazetteer, of 1813.

== History ==
The Bloomingdale Asylum was proposed in an address by Dr. Peter Middleton at King's College (today Columbia College), on November 3, 1769: "The necessity and usefulness of a public Infirmary has been so warmly and pathetically set forth in a discourse delivered by Dr. Samuel Bard, at the college commencement, in May last, that his Excellency, Sir Henry Moore immediately set on foot a subscription for that purpose to which himself and most of the gentlemen present liberally contributed." Subscriptions to this fund were continued, and in 1770, Doctors Peter Middleton, John Jones and Samuel Bard presented to the Colonial Government a petition for the incorporation of a public hospital. The petition was granted by a charter bearing the date of June 13, 1771 incorporating the "Society of the Hospital in the city of New York, in America", later termed the "Society of the New York Hospital". Between 1816 and 1818 the Society of the New York Hospital purchased 26 acres (11 ha) of land on which to build an asylum in a part of upper Manhattan, then largely farmland and referred to as Bloomingdale Asylum. According to Andrew Dolkart, the large, "elegantly detailed Federal style brownstone building" was ready for occupancy in 1821.

In 1829 the hospital erected another 30-bed building for a male population and in 1837 another building expansion for females. At the time the asylum was built it was the only hospital in the state caring for the mentally ill. Beginning in 1841, poor patients were moved to the newly opened New York City Lunatic Asylum on Blackwell's Island (now Roosevelt Island) and the Bloomingdale Asylum became the exclusive preserve of those whose families could afford to pay for their care. Plans to expand the asylum began in 1826. Two new buildings had been added by 1829, and the campus would continue to expand for many decades.

The grounds of the asylum were elegantly laid out with walks and gardens. Farming and gardening were considered therapeutic, so there was a working farm with orchards, vegetable gardens, barns and pasture land.

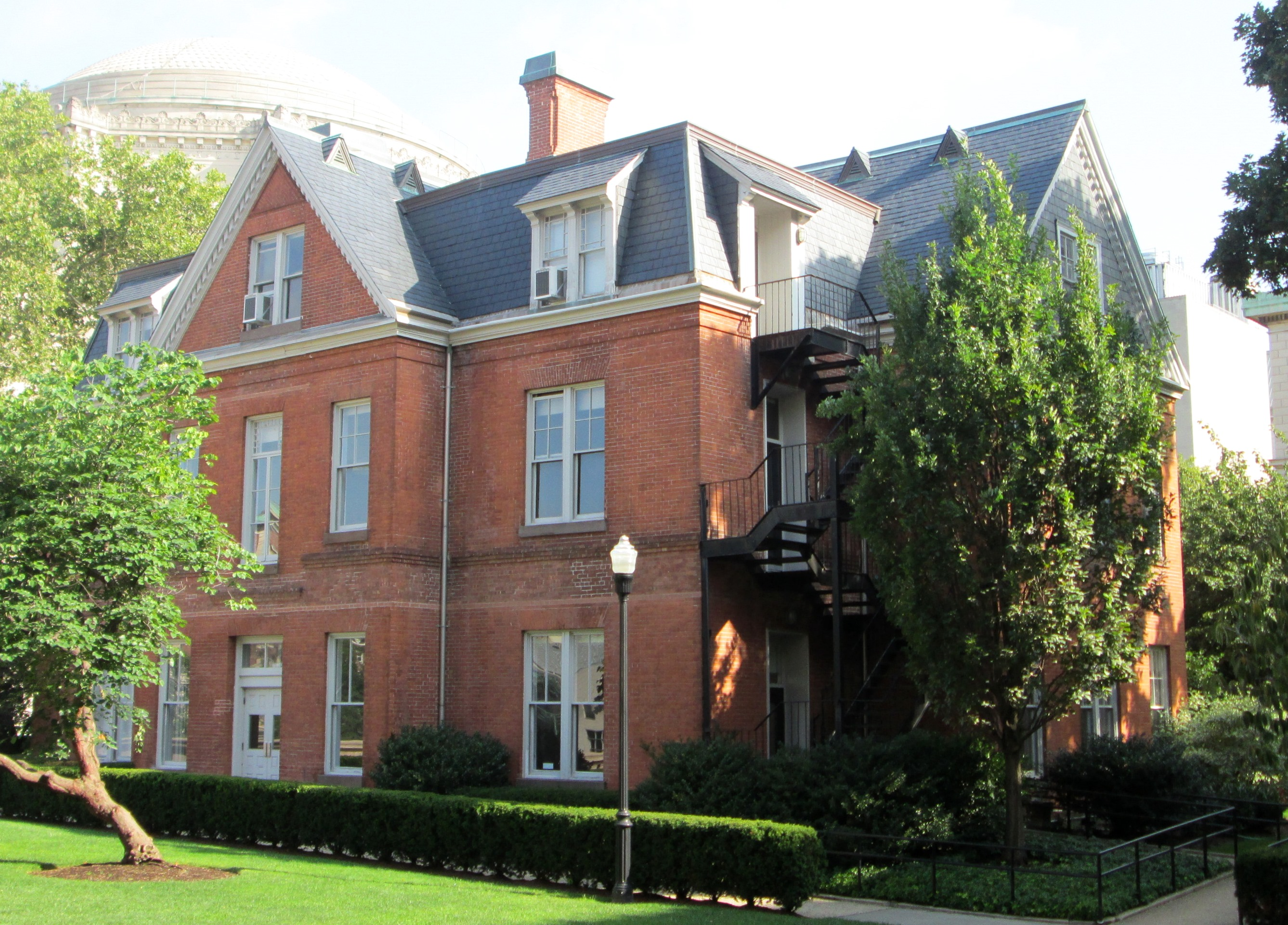
Buell Hall in 2014. Built in 1885, it is the only surviving asylum building.

In the 1880s, with the city expanding northward, the trustees of the New York Hospital began to sell parts of the Asylum's land to various institutions, including the Leake and Watts Orphan Asylum on the campus of what is now the Cathedral of St. John the Divine. The trustees of Columbia College, now Columbia University, bought the bulk of the Bloomingdale Asylum property in 1892 and began planning the construction of a new campus. Some of the property was purchased by The Juilliard School and served as its campus until 1969. The Manhattan School of Music currently occupies the property on Claremont Avenue.

In 1889, the Bloomingdale Asylum moved to a new campus in White Plains, New York. The campus was renamed the Payne Whitney Psychiatric Clinic, after Payne Whitney (1876–1927) bequeathed a large gift to New York Hospital specifically for mental health. Whitney was an American businessman and member of the influential Whitney family.

Today the campus is known as NewYork-Presbyterian Westchester Behavioral Health after the 1998 merger of New York and Presbyterian Hospitals. The historical records of the Bloomingdale Asylum are housed in the Medical Center Archives of the Weill Cornell Medical Library.

Columbia University occupied several buildings forming the old asylum in the early years. The last building erected on the Bloomingdale Asylum's Morningside Heights campus was the Macy Villa, a gabled, brick building with white trim, which was designed by architect Ralph Townsend to resemble a private home for the comfort of wealthy gentlemen afflicted with mental illnesses, and donated by William H. Macy in 1885. It is the only building from the old asylum that survives. It has had a number of uses over the years, but is now known as Buell Hall and houses La Maison Française.

The American artist Charles Deas was institutionalized at the asylum from 1848 until his death in 1867.

=== Controversy ===
In 1872, the New York journalist, Julius Chambers, conducted an undercover investigation of the institution by having himself committed with the help of his senior editor and some of his friends. After ten days, they had him released and a series of articles was published in the New York Tribune exposing abuses of inmates. This led to a dozen patients being released who were determined to be sane. The administration was reorganized and some administrators dismissed.
