= Sangre de Cristo Arts and Conference Center =

- The theater and school of dance at the Sangre de Cristo Arts and Conference Center.
- Established: 1972
- Location: Pueblo, Colorado
- Coordinates: 38°16′8.83″N 104°36′24.29″W
- Type: Art center
- Accreditation: American Alliance of Museums
- Visitors: 130,000+ (2019)
- Curator
- Website: www.sdc-arts.org

The Sangre de Cristo Arts and Conference Center is an art center located in Pueblo, Colorado, United States. Founded in 1972 as a multi-disciplinary center for the arts, it features art galleries, performing arts, and the Buell Children's Museum. The center is a multiple time, multiple category winner at the Best of Pueblo awards.

== History ==
The Sangre de Cristo Arts and Conference Center opened in 1972, with funding provided by the Economic Development Administration and Pueblo County. The original two-building complex housed a single gallery, a five hundred seat theater, studio/classroom spaces, a dance studio and a conference/banquet facility.

In 1982, an expansion, funded by Puebloan Helen T. White, added three galleries, a gift shop and a small precursor children's museum.

In 2000, a further expansion added the 12,000 square-foot, two-level Buell Children's Museum and the Jackson Sculpture Garden.

== Exhibitions ==
The art center features twenty-four new exhibitions a year in the Helen T. White Galleries. The King Gallery hosts the permanent collections.

=== Permanent ===
- Francis King Collection of Western Art
- Ruth Gast Santos and Southwest Collection
- Gene Kloss Collection
- Regional Contemporary Collection
