= Hillhouse =

Hillhouse may refer to:

== People ==
- Alex Hillhouse (1907–1983), Australian athlete who competed in the 1932 Summer Olympics
- Art Hillhouse (1916–1980), American professional basketball player
- Christa Hillhouse of "4 Non Blondes", an American rock band from San Francisco, California
- David Hillhouse Buel (disambiguation)
- Euan Hillhouse Methven Cox (1893–1977), Scottish plant collector, botanist, and horticulturist
- Gregory L. Hillhouse (1955–2014), American chemistry professor
- James Hillhouse (1754–1832), American lawyer, real estate developer, and politician
- James Hillhouse Fuertes (1863–1932), American civil and sanitary engineer
- Joanne C. Hillhouse (born 1970s), Antiguan writer and journalist
- Raelynn Hillhouse, American national security and Intelligence community analyst, former smuggler, spy novelist and health care executive
- Sarah Porter Hillhouse (1763–1831), Georgia's first woman editor and printer
- Thomas Hillhouse (adjutant general) (1817–1897), American farmer, banker and politician
- Thomas P. Hillhouse, QC (1898–1991), Canadian politician
- William Hillhouse FLS (1850–1910), British botany professor
- Willie Hillhouse (1891–1968), Scottish footballer with Motherwell, Albion Rovers, Third Lanark
- Clifford Hillhouse Pope (1899–1974), American herpetologist
- Oliver Hillhouse Prince (1787–1837), American editor, attorney, and politician

== Geography ==
- Hillhouse, Hamilton, a housing estate in Hamilton, South Lanarkshire, Scotland
- Hillhouse, Mississippi, an unincorporated community in Coahoma County, Mississippi, U.S.
- Hillhouse Avenue, in New Haven, Connecticut, U.S.
- Hillhouse High School, a high school in New Haven, Connecticut, U.S.
- Platform Hillhouse, a platform in the Dos Cuadras Offshore Oil Field, Santa Barbara Channel, California, U.S.
- Hillhouse Hollow, a stream valley in the Ozarks of southern Missouri, U.S.

== Other ==
- Hillhouse Capital Group, an Asia-based investment management firm
- Lord Hillhouse or Earl of Ruglen, a title in the Peerage of Scotland

== See also ==
- Hilhouse, a former shipbuilder in Bristol, England
- Hill House (disambiguation)
- Hiller House (disambiguation)
- Hills House (disambiguation)
