= David Hillhouse Buel =

David Hillhouse Buel may refer to:

- David Hillhouse Buel (priest) (1862–1923), American Jesuit and president of Georgetown University; later an Episcopal minister
- David Hillhouse Buel (soldier) (1839–1870), Union Army officer

== See also ==
- Buel (disambiguation)
- Hillhouse (disambiguation)
