= International Voluntary Services =

- Founded: 1953
- Founder: Private individuals, especially those from Mennonite, Brethren, and Quaker Churches
- Dissolved: 2002
- Type: Private international development organization
- Location: Washington, D.C.
- Region served: 39 countries
- Method: Volunteerism

International Voluntary Services, Inc. (IVS) was a private, non-profit corporation for benevolent, charitable, and educational purposes chartered under the laws of the District of Columbia in 1953 to place volunteers in international humanitarian and development projects. From its founding until its dissolution in 2002, IVS placed volunteers in 39 countries in Asia, Africa, and Latin America. Its largest and longest programs were in South Vietnam, Laos, Algeria, and Bangladesh. Although the organization's roots were grounded in part in Christian pacifism, it operated on a nonsectarian basis, accepting volunteers regardless of their religious beliefs or nationality.^{,} Over its lifetime, the IVS program evolved from the placement of only American citizen volunteers to placement of internationally recruited volunteers and then in later years to recruitment of local volunteers from within the country being assisted. Elements of the IVS program model have been adopted by the U.S. Peace Corps and many present day non-governmental organizations (NGOs). Sections below discuss the IVS program model, activities over time, and legacy.

Much of this article is based on two books on the IVS experience: The Fortunate Few: IVS Volunteers From Asia To The Andes by Thierry Sagnier and A Legacy Of America's Global Volunteerism - International Voluntary Services (1953-2002) edited by Gary Alex, Mike Chilton, and Frederic C. Benson. Much documentation on IVS is available in the IVS Collection of the Mennonite Church USA Archives, 3145 Benham Ave., Elkhart, IN 46517.

== Founding of International Voluntary Services (IVS) ==
IVS was founded and its organization and program heavily influenced by: 1) staff of the new U.S. foreign assistance agency in 1953; 2) private individuals from traditional peace churches and other groups; and 3) its first Executive Director.

The 1948 Marshall Plan for direct U.S. assistance to Europe for recovery after World War II proved highly successful. President Truman in his 1949 inauguration speech proposed to extend the Marshall Plan concept with a “Four Point” program, including an ambitious fourth point for “a bold new program for making the benefits of our scientific advances and industrial progress available for the improvement and growth of underdeveloped areas.” A Technical Cooperation Administration (TCA) was charged with implementing this program.

Two men in the newly created TCA, Stanley Andrews and Dale D. Clarke, saw the potential to tap talents of the religious community for the new initiative. Andrews identified about 75 religious organizations with programs around the world that understood local conditions and were supported by American citizens, who were willing to work for the common good. He felt they could come together to form a non-profit organization to send young people out to work in village development activities. Andrews also recognized the need to assist in bringing such an organization into reality and assigned Dale Clark to this task.

Clark accepted this assignment and met with an interested group that included: Mennonite Central Committee representative William Snyder, W. Harold Rowe of the Brethren Service Committee, and Benjamin Bushong, Director of the Brethren’s Heifer Project. Clark outlined the concept and arranged an initial planning meeting. At that planning meeting (date unknown), Clark stressed the need for an interdenominational approach adapted to needs of the Point Four Program and provided the group with a copy of the Near East Foundation charter to use as a model. The church representatives agreed that there was a role for young, well-trained agriculturalists and nurses to work in rural villages of developing nations.

IVS’s corporate charter, dated February 16, 1953, stated as its first objective “to utilize the services of volunteers on an organized basis to combat hunger, poverty, disease, and illiteracy in the underdeveloped areas of the world and thereby further the peace, happiness and prosperity of the peoples thereof.” Arrangements for initial projects in Egypt and Iraq were completed by July, when the first meeting of the IVS Board of Directors confirmed the concepts for the new organization. IVS would be a “people-to-people” program where local people were participants in IVS projects and not just recipients of foreign assistance and that it should remain independent and private in nature.

An Operations Advisory Committee (OAC) set up to guide institutional and program development included, in addition to Rowe, Snyder, and Bushong: Roy A. Burkhart of World Neighbors, John H. Reisner of Agricultural Missions, Inc. and former dean of an agricultural college in China, Franklin S. Harris of Salt Lake City, E.B. Evans of Prairie View A & M College, Captain William H. Tuck, director general of international refugees during World War II, Carl C. Taylor of the Ford Foundation, and Margaret Hickey, an attorney, journalist, and women's rights activist. While a diverse group, key leadership and program design came from representatives of three traditional “peace churches”: the Religious Society of Friends (Quakers), the Mennonites, and the Church of the Brethren. Because the three churches opposed war, as an alternative to military service, their members sought Conscientious Objector status so volunteers could serve in various Alternative Service roles in lieu of military service. This and their humanitarian service ethic gave them a wealth of experience in international work, experience that proved very relevant to the IVS agenda.

Managing the fledgling IVS organization fell to its first Executive Director, John S. Noffsinger, who assumed the position in 1953 and served until he left to work at the new Peace Corps in 1961. Noffsinger had spent two years assigned to a town in the far northeastern province of Cagayan of the Philippines under an American colonial program to establish a Philippine public education system. This program relied on youthful American teachers that came to be called “Thomasites” after the ship, the USS Thomas, that brought about 600 of these young Americans to Manila in 1901. After his two years in the Philippines, Noffsinger received a Ph.D. in Education from Columbia University and spent his adult working life in education. He had retired by 1953 but retained a desire to assist people overseas. His experience as a teacher in the Philippines and as an educator were foundational in his shaping the IVS, and later the Peace Corps, programs.

== IVS Program Model Evolution Over Time ==
IVS’s initial program model was that of sending teams of volunteers for two-year assignments to work on rural development from training centers supported by the U.S. International Cooperation Administration (Egypt, Iraq, Nepal, Laos, Vietnam). As an example, the Iraq program had a team including: a crop production volunteer, livestock volunteer, two home economics volunteers, two farm equipment/engineering volunteers, and a Country Team Leader. Volunteers were mostly young Americans with agriculture and rural backgrounds supervised by a senior Country Team Leader. Volunteers were people who chose to work in a foreign country usually at a grass roots level for nominal pay for two years. They were required to possess a skill useful to local people, learn the local language, develop an understanding of the local culture, and work on a person-to-person basis. The model was considered highly effective.

As IVS entered the 1960s, the program model evolved from placing multiple volunteers together on teams to that of individual volunteer placements. Rural development and agriculture remained a focus, but education assignments also became important (Laos, Liberia, Algeria) and assignments diversified into public health and other fields. The program model continued – largely, but not exclusively – to support U.S. government development agency programs (Laos, Vietnam, Morocco, Algeria, Bangladesh, Congo). IVS began recruiting non-American volunteers and, by the early 1970s, committed to increasing multinational recruitment of volunteers, staff, and board members. The U.S. Peace Corps adopted the IVS program model for its American volunteer assignments and has continued it for sixty years.

The IVS program changed substantially in the late 1970s and early 1980s as IVS committed to diversifying its funding and becoming more independent of the U.S. Government in its development activities. Program activities became much more diverse. Some U.S. Government funding continued for specific and comprehensive country projects including operating costs, construction, materials, training, and other inputs complementing volunteer services (Sudan, Bangladesh, Botswana). At the same time, a change in USAID policy provided central program funding for NGOs and allowed IVS to independently launch project activities in countries of its choice (Mauritania, Honduras, Indonesia, Ecuador, Bolivia, Papua New Guinea, Sudan). These programs generally involved fewer and more experienced volunteers working with partner organizations that had resources needed to support volunteer activities. Increasing numbers of staff and volunteers were recruited from outside the U.S. IVS was forced to compete for funding with other NGOs, many of which were engaged in economic development and relief work. Consequently, cost effectiveness and program flexibility became major considerations.

In the 1980s, IVS transitioned its program model to the use of skilled local volunteers supported by a few international professionals. By the end of the decade, over 80 percent of IVS staff and volunteers were host country nationals or internationals. IVS/Bangladesh to some extent pioneered this with the establishment of a National Volunteer Program for professionals and a Village Volunteer Program for community service workers implementing literacy, disaster preparedness, agriculture, health, organization development, and micro-credit projects. Other programs in Ecuador, Bolivia, Botswana, Caribbean, and Zimbabwe also used local volunteers extensively. Programs emphasized local organizational capacity development, often working independently with local NGOs. IVS committed to participatory approaches, targeting basic human needs and poverty reduction, and empowering local people by strengthening local organizations. Some program direction changes were self-initiated, while others were a pragmatic attempt to keep up with changing priorities for USAID, which moved away from the agriculture and rural development programs that had been an emphasis of IVS.

Throughout its fifth decade, IVS struggled with funding limitations, but retained a commitment to self-help projects using volunteers from developing countries and appropriate technologies to develop self-reliant communities. IVS volunteers served as consultants helping communities solve their own problems with their own resources. The thematic focus was on sustainable agriculture, assistance to exploited minorities, income generation for women, and AIDS prevention. However, most funding was from sub-contracts with USAID-funded projects to provide local field staff as IVS volunteers for their projects (Bolivia, Bangladesh). Other activities were implemented with private funds but were small scale and provided little funding for home office operations (Ecuador, Southeast Asia, Bangladesh). IVS committed to establishing local organizations to continue IVS-type services as sustainability strategy, but these did not survive the closure of IVS (Caribbean, Ecuador, Bolivia, Bangladesh). IVS lost its unique volunteer-based program model but continued its commitment to community level service delivery and participatory development.

== 1st Decade Program (1953–1962) - Start Up ==
The first decade of IVS focused on establishing management systems and starting country programs. The first four country programs were in the Middle East and South Asia for the following reasons: 1) individuals from the Peace Churches had prior experience in the region; 2) the U.S. foreign assistance agency staff of the International Cooperation Administration (ICA) [Link to his Wiki article] supporting establishment of IVS had contacts there; and 3) the area was a priority for U.S. foreign policy due to the political tensions following formation of Israel. As these programs got underway, IVS explored additional opportunities in Asia and launched programs in Indochina, where the U.S. was seeking to counter communist insurgencies. Profiles of country programs started in this decade are listed below.

- The IVS/Egypt Program with four volunteers from 1953 to 1954 was based at a demonstration farm supporting agricultural extension services and staffed by two initial volunteers transferred from Peace Church assignments. The program was highly-regarded but closed during the Suez Crisis.
- The IVS/Jordan program with two volunteers from 1954 to 1955 focused on poultry production at an orphanage run by a local NGO (Arab Development Society). The program closed after local riots unrelated to the project disrupted operations.
- The IVS/Iraq Program with 20 volunteers from 1953 to 1957 became the first substantial project, working with the Iraqi Government at a Community Development Center to develop approaches for a national community development program. The program closed when the Government of Iraq opted to take over complete control of program.
- The IVS/Nepal Program with four volunteers from 1956 to 1958 supported a Rural Development Training School with an agricultural extension program, a mobile teacher training program, and an anti-malaria program. The program closed when the Government of India took over responsibility for rural development training in Nepal.
- The IVS/Laos Program with 384 volunteers from 1956 to 1975 started with a rural development team for a teaching and demonstration program emphasizing community self-help. An education team was added later. The program evolved with volunteers assigned individually rather than in teams. As the communist insurgency expanded, rural development activities were increasingly disrupted by the war and became more oriented to assisting refugees, strengthening local government, and countering insurgency. An education team focused on teacher training schools and developing a national education system. Six volunteers died in Laos, four from hostile action, one from drowning, and one in a plane crash. The program closed after the communist take-over of the country.
- The IVS/Vietnam Program with 416 volunteers from 1956 to 1972 was the largest in numbers of volunteers and focused on refugee resettlement, agriculture, and education. Volunteers worked on a wide range of activities, including minority people development, malaria control, mobile science teaching, youth development, and English training. As the war intensified and the American presence increased, volunteers found work more difficult and dangerous. Three volunteers died in Vietnam, two from hostile action and one from a vehicle accident, and three were taken prisoner by the North Vietnamese during the 1968 Tet offensive. The program closed when the Government of South Vietnam declined to extend it prior to elections in 1971.
- The IVS/Cambodia Program with 25 volunteers from 1960 to 1964 had agriculture, education, and rural development teams. It was forced to closed when prime Minister Sihanouk broke relations with U.S. and no private funding was available to continue the program.
- The IVS/Ghana initiative involved only two volunteers from 1960 to 1961. Volunteers worked with the Rockefeller Brothers Fund to introduce a machine to make bricks from earth and cement.
- The IVS/Liberia Program with 24 volunteers from 1960 to 1963 focused on developing village primary education. After the Peace Corps was established, the program was to become a joint IVS-Peace Corps program, but Peace Corps soon took over and IVS was phased out.

The initial programs (Egypt and Jordan) were small and privately funded. Subsequent programs were mainly larger and funded by the International Cooperation Administration for a program model of teams of volunteers to work on community development from a local training center. As an example, the Iraq program had a team including: a crop production volunteer, livestock volunteer, two home economics volunteers, two farm equipment/engineering volunteers, and a Country Team Leader. Later, education programs were added, complementing rural development and agricultural work.

Initial programs demonstrated that volunteers could perform well and had valued skills to meet local needs. Most programs worked closely with U.S. foreign assistance agency staff, effectively using foreign assistance program resources and program direction for work at the community level. Positive reporting on the IVS volunteers by embassy staff, reporters, and Congressional delegations led to Congressional proposals for a “Point 4 Youth Corps” and eventually the formation of the Peace Corps modeled after IVS.

The decade provided other lessons. Volunteers found that technologies and innovations had to be tailored to local conditions, and IVS found the need to add a staff specialist position to provide teams with technical guidance and to share lessons learned across countries. More troubling was the instability in programs (Egypt, Jordan. Iraq, Nepal, Liberia, Cambodia) forced to close due to shifts in international relations, U.S. government strategies, or host country policies.

== 2nd Decade Program (1963–1972) – Expansion and Change ==
IVS’s second decade began with strong programs in place in Laos and Vietnam and proven models for effective use of volunteers. The new Peace Corps was expected to be a reliable source of funding for private volunteer programs. IVS teams worked closely with the U.S. government development agency on rural development programs and had added education programs. Nine new country programs were launched in the following countries:

- The IVS/UN Relief and Works Agency (UNRWA) Program with eight volunteers from 1963 to 1965 provided teachers for English and athletic programs for Palestine refugees.
- The IVS/Algeria Program with 122 volunteers ran from 1963 to 1966 and then after a gap resumed from 1968 to 1974. This was the third largest program in terms of volunteers. The initial phase funded by USAID focused on Soil Conservation. The second phase funded largely by the Government of Algeria was for English teaching.
- The IVS/Morocco Program with 12 volunteers working in Range Management ran from1968 to 1974.
- The IVS/Congo (Zaire) Program with 19 volunteers operated in two phases – from 1970 to 1974 focused on Agricultural Credit and Cooperatives and then from 1986 to 1989 working on Public Health.
- The IVS/Yemen Program with 13 volunteers from 1971 to 1979 worked in Agriculture and Public Health.
- The small IVS/Indonesia Program with two volunteers from 1972 to 1976 was funded by CARE and assisted in strengthening a local governmental volunteer program (Badan Urusan Tenaga Kerja Sukarela Indonesia or BUTSI).
- The IVS/Bangladesh Program with 53 volunteers was the longest running IVS program, operating from 1972 to 2002. The initial program in the aftermath of the Bangladesh Liberation War helped provide leadership for growth of local civil society organizations. Volunteers worked mainly on Agriculture and Organizational Development.
- A small Malaysia (Sabah) Program with three volunteers funded by the Asia Foundation from 1965 to 1967 taught English to civil servants and helped develop an educational resource center.
- A small IVS/Libya Program from 1971 to 1973 involved two volunteers working on a 10,000-hectare production project of the Kufra Agricultural Company.

Two major challenges arose for IVS during this decade. First, the newly created Peace Corps chose to field volunteers directly and not, as expected, fund other private agencies to do so. Its secure funding, high visibility, and government support enabled the Peace Corps to open programs in many countries. IVS opted to avoid overlap in working in the same countries and ended up working in more “difficult” countries.

A larger problem was the escalating civil wars in Vietnam and Laos, where IVS had its major programs. Approximately 800 volunteer assignments (56% of all IVS assignments) were in those two countries over the full period IVS worked there. Volunteers worked in both rural and urban settings. Many volunteers, such as Edgar “Pop” Buell in Laos and David Nuttle in Vietnam actively supported counter-insurgency efforts, but by the late 1960s, as fighting intensified and American involvement grew, volunteers’ work became more difficult, and many began to question or oppose the war. Nine volunteers died in Laos and Vietnam, seven due to hostile action, and three others were captured, one was released within weeks and two were imprisoned in North Vietnam for about five years. The first volunteer to lose his life was Peter M. Hunting, killed in an ambush in the Mekong Delta in 1965.

Volunteers were torn between their commitment to continuing service to Laos and Vietnam and opposition to the war. This climaxed in 1967, when 49 IVS volunteers signed a letter addressed to President Lyndon Johnson and shared with the New York Times describing the devastating impact of the U.S. military presence in Vietnam. The letter noted the dissatisfaction of many IVS team members with the U.S. war effort and announcing the resignation of IVS Country Chief of Party Don Luce and three other IVS team leaders. Don Luce and John Sommer later recounted their experiences in Viet Nam in an influential book, Viet Nam – The Unheard Voices. On March 15, 1971, volunteers in Laos wrote to President Richard Nixon protesting U.S. support for the South Vietnamese military invasion of Laos. A White House response acknowledged the letter and described U.S. policy in opposing insurgencies in Laos and Vietnam. These developments led to IVS’s distancing itself from USAID in Vietnam in the late 1960s and in Laos in the early 1970s and closing programs in Vietnam in 1971 and Laos in 1975.

As a result of the worsening situation in Indochina, the IVS Board of Directors met in Harpers Ferry, West Virginia in 1971 to assess the continued relevance of IVS and international volunteerism. The meeting concluded that there remained a role for volunteers and that IVS would need to:

- Continue to provide volunteers to meet humanitarian and development needs in Asia, Africa, Latin America, and the United States;
- Broaden financial support to ensure at least 50% of funding from non-USG sources; and
- Increase multinational recruitment of volunteers, staff, and board members.

These commitments greatly influenced IVS program operations through the rest of its life. The large numbers of volunteers who served in Laos and Vietnam also influenced later programs and management and formed the core of IVS alumni activities in support of the IVS programs.

== 3rd Decade Program (1973–1982) - Internationalization ==
The decisions of the 1971 Harpers Ferry meeting and changes in global development assistance strategies program changed IVS in its third decade. By 1975, all volunteers had been pulled out of mainland southeast Asia, ending the "Indochina" period of IVS. Expansion in other regions around the world gave IVS a diverse, dispersed, and challenging portfolio of development projects. The Bangladesh Program was prominent with its work in agriculture, horticulture, and health and family planning, as well as its support to development of local NGOs. IVS moved into Latin America in a significant way.

IVS committed to internationalizing staff and diversifying its funding base. In 1974, the U.S. Agency for International Development (USAID) began funding IVS through a Washington General Support Grant that allowed IVS more independence in programming than did country grants for specific projects. In 1977, IVS opened an office for two years in Luxembourg to seek European funding and recruit European volunteers. Over the decade, IVS started programs in the following nine countries:

- The IVS Sudan Program with 43 volunteers from 1973 to 1983 worked in diverse activities relating to Women’s Education, Agricultural Rehabilitation, Resettlement, Agricultural Research, and Small Business Development. It closed due to lack of funding and imminent civil war.
- The IVS Ecuador Program with 48 volunteers from 1974 to 2002 involved a diverse program for agricultural production, cooperative development, and public health focused on minority communities in the Amazon, highlands, and Afro-Ecuadorian coastal areas.
- The IVS Mauritania Program with 11 volunteers from 1975 to 1979 worked on Rural Water Resource Development and closed due to lack of funding and the difficult operating environment.
- The IVS Papua New Guinea Program with 39 volunteers from 1975 to 1984 worked on Business Development, Sustainable Agriculture, and Public Health and Nutrition. It too closed due to lack of funding, high costs, and limited impacts.
- The IVS Colombia Program with three volunteers ran from 1975 to 1976, strengthening a farmer training institute.
- An IVS Madagascar initiative from 1975 to 1977 consisted of one volunteer working with other NGOs on design of water projects.
- The IVS Bolivia Program with 30 volunteers from 1975 to 2001 evolved over time with varied emphasis on Camelid Production, Handicrafts, Cooperatives, and Coca Substitution.
- The IVS Botswana Program with 33 volunteers from 1975 to 1988 worked with Horticulture, Cooperatives, and Forestry and evolved from implementation of specific USAID projects to placement of volunteers with local organizations.
- The IVS Honduras Program with 27 volunteers from 1975 to 1987 provided technical support to local organizations on diverse activities relating to Soybeans, Health and Sanitation, and Micro-enterprise Development.

Throughout the decade IVS was successful in internationalizing its program. By 1979, more than half of its volunteers were non-US citizens. Diversifying funding was more difficult but became essential as new USAID grants required matching funding from non-US government sources to cover at least half of program costs. IVS was able to obtain private funding from many sources, but most were in modest amounts.

IVS programs changed. Funding constraints limited project volunteer numbers. Donor agencies, particularly the U.S. government, were unwilling to fund larger programs, in part because the Peace Corps was fielding large numbers of volunteers. In previous programs, IVS volunteers had access to other resources from U.S. government assistance programs to expedite their work (Iraq, Nepal, Laos, Vietnam, Morocco, Congo, and others). This continued in some countries (Yemen, Bangladesh), but in other countries IVS had to find other partners with which to collaborate. In a few cases (Sudan, Botswana, Bangladesh), IVS obtained USAID country funding for comprehensive projects including operating costs, construction, materials, training, and other inputs to complement volunteer services.

Programs began to require volunteers with more experience and specialized skills. This reflected the increasing sophistication of organizations assisted within host countries. In addition, the limited numbers of volunteers within a country program made it impossible to cost-effectively provide needed support and required volunteers to be more self-sufficient.

== 4th Decade Program (1983–1992) - Localization ==
This period saw IVS complete its transition from the earlier model of sending numbers of young international volunteers to work in a country to using a few international professionals and recruiting skilled and educated locals as volunteers in their country program. By the 1990s over 80% of IVS staff and volunteers were host country nationals or internationals. This was pioneered by IVS/Bangladesh, which established a National Volunteer Program of professionals and Village Volunteer Program of community service workers to implement literacy, disaster preparedness, agriculture, health, organization development, and micro-credit projects. The Ecuador, Bolivia, Botswana, Caribbean, and Zimbabwe programs also used local volunteers. Bolivia and Bangladesh had relatively large local volunteer programs, as other USAID projects sub-contracted with IVS to provide local field staff for their projects.

During this period, the IVS programs emphasized local organizational capacity development and often worked independently with local NGOs. Budget limitations generally restricted IVS to provision of services with little funding for other project costs. As a result, IVS often worked with other aid organizations, supplying volunteers to these existing programs. U.S. development assistance began to de-emphasize agriculture and rural development, which had been a major focus on many earlier IVS programs. During this decade, six new country programs were launched in the following countries:

- The IVS Caribbean Program with eight volunteers from 1983 to 1989 provided Enterprise Development Services in Antigua and Barbuda, St. Kitts and Nevis, Dominica, St. Lucia, St. Vincent and the Grenadines, and Grenada.
- The IVS Zimbabwe Program with 21 volunteers from 1983 to 1992 worked on Cooperative Development, Micro-enterprise Development, and Agriculture.
- An IVS Ethiopia initiative in 1984 provided one volunteer to fill a medical staff position for Africare clinics.
- An IVS Cape Verde initiative involved one volunteer from 1987 to 1988 to help design a new cooperative project with Unitarian Universalist Service Committee.
- An IVS Mali initiative in 1988 provided two volunteers to work with Hunger Foundation and OEF International (formerly, Overseas Education Fund) on an income generation and credit program.
- The IVS Southeast Asia Program with three volunteers from 1991 to 2002 worked on HIV/AIDS Prevention with commercial sex workers in Thailand, Cambodia, and Vietnam.

By the late 1980s, IVS was struggling. Funding was a perennial problem with remaining high dependency on USAID grants but weakening relations with USAID. Funding from Washington allowed IVS programming independence but weakened working relationships at the country level and limited potential for larger country-level funding. With more NGOs active, competition for donor funding had become intense. Private funding was often too limited to launch substantive programs and programs required a certain scale to be cost-effective. IVS struggled to meet its required 50 percent match for USAID grants.

Local and regional volunteers were effective and often very well qualified. Still, reliance on local volunteers eliminated the cultural exchange and citizen diplomacy element of international volunteerism. This reduced IVS’s domestic constituency for international volunteerism. There was also a question of definition of “volunteers” as local volunteers were often paid at or above the local salary scales. Other agencies could just as easily hire local staff for their projects, and IVS’s unique institutional capability for value addition to international development was eroded.

== 5th Decade Program (1993–2002) - The End Game ==
By the 1990s, IVS’s financial situation was desperate, and the organization was kept alive only by committed staff working largely on a voluntary basis. Remaining programs were limited to: Bangladesh, which had some European and private funding and a contract to provide local volunteers as field staff for a USAID grantee’s project; Bolivia, which also had a contract to provide local and regional volunteers for a USAID contractor’s project; Ecuador, which had a small program and a local country director committed to continuing work if funding became available; and the Southeast Asia HIV/AIDS Prevention project in Vietnam, Thailand, and Cambodia which operated on a small and declining basis. The only program to continue substantial activities until 2002 was Bangladesh.

By about 1993/94, USAID funding ended. This was the first time in 40 years that IVS was not receiving U.S. government funding. Several factors contributed to this. USAID central funding for global programs declined. More seriously, IVS had struggled to meet its required private funding match of the government grant funds and to provide a convincing argument for its developmental impacts. The indirect funding coming to IVS from other organizations funded by USAID, as mentioned above, continued after this, but the lack of direct funding from USAID for IVS core programs and management costs was a severe blow.

As its funding declined during the 1990s, IVS committed itself to establishing local organizations to continue to IVS-type services. An earlier model for this had been Friends In Village Development, Bangladesh (FIVDB), which spun off from an IVS activity in 1979 to become a sustainable local NGO. In 1984, the IVS Caribbean Program volunteers had also formed a local entity, Caribbean Advisory and Professional Services to continue business development service provision to local entrepreneurs after the end of the IVS project. When the eventuality of closing IVS became unavoidable, the organization committed itself to establishing its remaining operating programs in Bolivia, Ecuador, and Bangladesh as national NGOs. In the 1990s, IVS fostered creation of Fundación Mina in Ecuador, IVS Bangladesh in Bangladesh, and IVS/Bolivia in Bolivia. Unfortunately, none of these, except FIVDB, survived long.

Several initiatives were attempted to turn things around to enable IVS to continue. A 1996 strategic alliance with PACT (formerly Private Agencies Collaborating Together) allowed IVS to use USAID funds to design a new program for local voluntary organizations, but no new project resulted, and the alliance faded away. A 2000 “IVS Program Development Sub-Committee” sought to establish a new flexible, self-financed volunteer program and restart other development activities. Two short term volunteers were sent to Vietnam, but that was the only activity, and by then IVS had too few resources to relaunch significant activities. In 2001, an alumni-proposed “IVS Endowment Fund” to support IVS renewal was well received but again this was too late. On November 30, 2001, the IVS Board concluded there were no other options and decided to dissolve IVS by March 30, 2002.

Following dissolution of IVS, an active IVS Alumni Association has continued as a network for volunteers and friends of IVS to stay in contact. IVS alumni established a small 501(c)3 organization, “IVS for Development,” to promote volunteerism and document the history and impacts of IVS.

== Finances ==
IVS always had some private support, but from its beginning IVS relied heavily on funding from the United States Agency for International Development (USAID) and its predecessors, the United States Technical Cooperation Administration (TCA) and the United States International Cooperation Administration (ICA). Records indicate that ICA/USAID funds accounted for about 92 percent of IVS’s total funding up to 1960. Until 1973, ICA/USAID funding was largely through service contracts with regional or country offices.

From the early 1970s, IVS took steps to broaden its financial base and reduce the share of government funding to less than 50 percent. This decision coincided with a policy change within USAID to require a 50 percent matching contribution for its grants to private voluntary organizations. From 1976 to 1993, the USAID share of IVS’s funding was about 48 percent.

IVS received private funding from many churches, corporations, individuals, European organizations, and others, but amounts were modest and often covered only country activities and not the Washington management and overhead costs. As an example, in 1993, IVS had funding of $1.1 million U.S. dollars from 288 individual donors and 35 institutional donors. Substantial fundraising efforts were needed to reach this number of donors.

IVS found itself in the funding predicament of having a foot in both public and private funding worlds. Neither was big enough to ensure financial viability or achieve a convincing scale of operations and institutional identity. Dependency on government funding was a critical problem for the organization, as it required IVS to respond to changing government priorities that may have differed from those of a volunteer organization. IVS never developed a strong fiscal support system.

== People ==
Volunteers were the heart of IVS, bringing a commitment of services to others and a naive optimism. Records are incomplete, but, over 50 years, at least 1,368 IVS volunteers served on 1,419 assignments in 39 countries. Forty-eight volunteers served in two countries and three in three countries. The typical assignment was two years, but some were much less than this and some much longer. Forty-three IVS volunteers also served as Peace Corps volunteers, and at least 15 IVS volunteers and staff also served in Peace Corps staff and management positions. A considerable number of early IVS volunteers also completed U.S. military service.

IVS was an ambitious experiment, positing that placing young people in foreign countries and institutions could promote social and economic development. IVS management initially considered the ideal IVS volunteer to be of small town or farm origin, be single and 20-30 years of age, have completed at least a significant part of a college degree, be of good character, and have a dedication to service. Over time, most of these criteria were put aside, except - hopefully – those for the good character and dedication to service.

One issue was whether IVS service would be acceptable to the Selective Service as “alternative service” in place of military service. This was important to the Peace Churches, whose members frequently sought “conscientious objector” status and avoided serving in the military, because of their opposition to war. IVS determined that conscientious objector status was not automatic, and young men would have to petition their local draft board for such status. Many IVS volunteers did their IVS assignments as alternative service, but many others did not have or seek such status.

Volunteers from other countries and the national and regional volunteers of later years typically exhibited the same volunteer spirit and commitment to serving others as embodied in the IVS ethos. Some volunteers became prominent during their service. Others gained recognition later. Many went on to careers in foreign service, business, government, and civil society organizations that benefited greatly from their volunteer experience.

Regrettably, ten volunteers died during their volunteer assignments – one in Ecuador, three in Vietnam, and six in Laos.

Executive Directors provided leadership for IVS program development and management. Executive Directors over the lifetime of IVS were:

- John S. Noffsinger, 1953–1961
- Russell Stevenson, 1961–1964
- John Province, 1964–1965
- Arthur Z. Gardiner, 1965–1970
- Richard J. Peters, 1971–1974
- Anthony Lake, 1974–1976
- John Rigby, 1976–1980
- Nan Borton, 1981–1989
- David R. Smock, 1989–1991
- Linda Worthington/Don Luce, 1991–1993
- Don Luce, 1993–1996
- Parker F. Hallberg, 1996–1997
- Anne D. Shirk, 1998–2002

IVS Board of Directors included many diverse and prominent individuals, who provided overall direction for the organization. The Board of Director’s leadership position was variously termed President, Chairman, Honorary Director, and Director. Archival documentation lists the following as Board leaders:

- 1953 Roy A. Burkhart, World Neighbors
- 1954 Carl C. Taylor, Ford Foundation
- 1954 Captain William H. Tuck—former director of international refugee program during World War II
- 1954–1962 John H. Reisner, Executive Secretary of the Agricultural Missions, Inc. in New York and former Dean of agricultural college in China
- 1962–1964 Mervin G. Smith, Department of Agricultural Economics and Rural Sociology, Ohio State University
- 1964–1966 Monsignor Edwin W. O’Rourke, Executive Director of National Catholic Rural Life Conference
- 1969–1971 Carl C. Taylor, Agricultural Economist
- 1971–1977 Nicholas Katzenbach, former U.S. Attorney General
- 1978 June Pulcini (interim), IVS Cambodia 1963, Vietnam 1964-65, Laos 1965-70
- 1979–1984 Donald Fraser, Mayor of Minneapolis; former U.S. House of Representatives, Minnesota
- 1985–1992 Charles Whalen Jr., former U.S. House of Representatives, Ohio
- 1992–1997 Hugh Manke, IVS Vietnam 1967–71; Updike, Kelly and Spellacy Law Firm
- 1998–2002 Jeanette Goodstein, non-profit sector both in the U.S. and abroad

== Legacy ==
IVS was dissolved in 2002. It is considered a precursor to the Peace Corps. The archives of IVS are at the Mennonite Church USA Archives. Archival materials of Charles F. Sweet, an IVS volunteer who served in Vietnam during wartime, are available at Cornell University Library in its Division of Rare and Manuscript Collections.

Despite the complications of assessing the impact of development programs such as that of IVS due to the many variables involved in social or economic change, the legacy of IVS exists at two levels: its influence on organizations and its influence on and by individual volunteers. Notwithstanding the diverse, highly personal, scattered and often short activities of volunteers, IVS has left its mark after its closure March 31, 2002.

The most obvious organizational legacy of IVS is likely the U.S. Peace Corps, which was to a significant extent inspired by and modeled after the IVS programs started in the 1950s. Two politicians, Sen. Hubert Humphrey (D-Minnesota.) and Rep. Henry Reuss (D-Wisconsin) visited early IVS programs and were so impressed that, beginning in 1957, they pushed for creation of a U.S. government voluntary program to place American youth in international development projects run on a people-to-people basis. They passed this proposal on to President John F. Kennedy, whose administration launched the Peace Corps, drawing on IVS staff and operational policies in its establishment. Sargent Shriver, the first Peace Corps Director, hired IVS Director, John S. Noffsinger in 1961 to assist in launching Peace Corps and adopted much from IVS experience.

Over the years IVS's innovative programs guided by its executive directors and board members with diverse backgrounds provided lessons and direction for many other development efforts. IVS provided good program models through its leadership and/or effective programs in several areas: rural and community development, people-to-people exchanges, international volunteers, local volunteers, local organizational capacity development, agricultural technology adaptations, public-private partnerships, and others. Lessons learned from the IVS experience paved the way for future development of many other private and voluntary development efforts.

The legacy of work by individual volunteers and country programs is diverse, but likely derives from five types of impacts.

- Direct results from the volunteer’s assignment, such as training farmers, teaching students, digging wells, providing health care, etc.
- Capacity development in host individuals and local institutions to continue providing services, such as the development of an educational system in Laos, cooperatives in Bolivia, and local NGOs in Bangladesh.
- Influence on national policies or development program strategies, such as the introduction of a model for rural development in Iraq or improved range management strategies in Morocco.
- Personal influence on volunteers may be the most profound impact, influencing future careers and personal perspectives on life.
- Improved international understanding through interactions between volunteers and the host country cultures that influenced international relations and fostered goodwill.

Of course, not all volunteer impacts were positive. Some volunteers may have been unsuited to their assignments and some assignments may have been poorly defined. Volunteers may have provided inappropriate advice and some influences on individuals or institutions may have been negative. Still, most IVS volunteers have been quite positive as to their assignments.

Volunteerism lives on. While the influence of IVS on the diversity of international volunteer programs beyond the Peace Corps is uncertain, international volunteerism has grown. From 2004 to 2014 between 800,000 and 1,100,000 Americans volunteered internationally each year. IVS was an early leader in this movement.

== Notes and references ==
=== Further reading ===
- Alex, Gary, Mike Chilton, and Frederic C. Benson (eds.), A Legacy Of America's Global Volunteerism - International Voluntary Services (1953-2002), Peace Corps Writers Book, 2022.
- Benson, Frederic C., “IVS Volunteers in Rural Laos, 1956-1969,” in The Journal of Lao Studies, Volume 7, Issue 1, December 2020, pp. 1-36, http://laostudies.org/content/volume-7-issue-1-december-2020, 2020.
- Branfman, Fred (ed.), Voices from The Plain of Jars, Life Under an Air War, Harper & Row, Harper Colophon Books, 1972.
- Cayer, Marc, Prisoner in Viet Nam, Asia Resource Center, Washington, D.C., 1990.
- Chatterjee, Amal, Story of a lifetime of Anil, in English, (Chapters 1 to 4 on IVS/Vietnam and IVS/Algeria), https://storyofalifetimeofanil.wordpress.com/page/2/, WordPress, 2017.
- Elkind, Jessica, Aid Under Fire: Nation Building and the Vietnam War., University Press of Kentucky, Lexington, Kentucky. 2016.
- Finnell, Loren, “Still a Country Boy: After Embracing the World From Peace Corps Volunteer to Founder & CEO of the Resource Foundation,” A Life of Service, Mayfair Publishing, 2011.
- Huffman, Franklin E., Monks and Motorcycles: From Laos to London by the Seat of my Pants, 1956-1958, iUniverse, Inc., 2004.
- Hunting, Jill, Finding Pete: Rediscovering the Brother I Lost in Vietnam, Wesleyan University Press, Middletown, CT, 2009.
- Kreider, J. Kenneth, A Cup of Cold Water: The Story of Brethren Service, Brethren Press, 2001.
- Lewin, Howard S., Sunsets, Bulldozers, And Elephants: Twelve Years in Laos, The Stories I Never Told, Howard S. Lewin, 2005.
- Luce, Don and John Sommer, Vietnam, The Unheard Voices, Cornell University Press, Ithaca, NY, 1969.
- Malia, James E., “We Want to Build; They Want to Destroy: The Dilemma of Volunteering in
- Laos,” Southeast Review of Asian Studies, XX: 89-100, 1998.
- Manke, Hugh, “IVS and USAID in Vietnam: Who Left Whom?”, included in Collected IVS Stories, 2020, in IVS archives. c. 2016.
- Olson, Craig, Kenneth Koehn, Ruth Ammerman-Yabes, Peter Doan, David Goh, and Donald Jackson, “Private Voluntary Organizations and Institutional Development: Lessons from International Voluntary Services, Inc. and the Institute for International development. Inc”. Development Alternatives, Inc. and Cornell University, USAID, 1985.
- Poole, Richard, The Inca Smiled, The Growing Pains of an Aid Worker in Ecuador, Oxford, Oneworld Publications, 1993.
- Rawlings, Stuart (ed.), The IVS Experience From Algeria to Vietnam, International Voluntary Services, Inc., 1992.
- Rodell, Paul A., “John S. Noffsinger and the Global Impact of the Thomasite Experience,” (pp. 63-79) in Back to the Future: Perspectives on the Thomasite Legacy to Philippine Education, edited by Corazon Villareal, Quezon City, American Studies Association of the Philippines, 2003.
- Sagnier, Thierry, The Fortunate Few: IVS Volunteers From Asia To The Andes, NCNM Press, 2015.
- Schanche, Don A., Mister Pop, the Adventures of a Peaceful Man in a Small War. David McKay Company, Inc., New York, 1970.
- Shook, Cleo F., “Evaluation: International Voluntary Services, Inc., Contract No. AID/SOD/PDC-C-0241-6/7/79”, 1979.
- Stuckey, Richard, Embracing Life: With Twists and Turns, Xlibris US, 2021.
- Thomas, Winburn T., “The Vietnam Story of International Voluntary Services, Inc., Washington, D.C.: International Voluntary Services, Inc., June 30, 1972,” 302 paged typed report prepared for USAID: [https://web.archive.org/web/20110824054958/http://pdf.usaid.gov/pdf_docs/PNABI170.pdf USAID].)
- Villareal, D. (ed.), Back to the Future: Perspectives on the Thomasite Legacy to Philippine Education, American Studies Association of the Philippines, Manilla, 2003.
