= Buel =

Buel may refer to:

== Places ==
- Buel, Kansas
- Buel, Kentucky
- Lake Buel, Massachusetts, United States
- Buel Township, Michigan, United States

== People ==
- Alexander W. Buel
- David Hillhouse Buel (disambiguation)
- Samuel W. Buel

== See also ==
- Buell (disambiguation)
- Bühl (disambiguation)
