= Pop Buell =

American humanitarian

Edgar M. "Pop" Buell
- Born: 26 April 1913; Steuben County, Indiana
- Died: 30 December 1980 (aged 67); Manila, Philippines
- Occupations: Farmer, humanitarian aid worker
- Spouse: Mattie Lorene Gilbert (1914-1958)

Edgar "Pop" Buell (26 April 1913 – 30 December 1980) was a humanitarian aid worker in Laos. He was a farmer in Steuben County, Indiana, until the age of 47, but following the death of his wife in 1958 he joined the International Voluntary Services, a precursor to the Peace Corps, which offered him a job as an agricultural adviser in Laos. Buell worked in Laos through the Laotian Civil War, organizing relief aid to refugees and isolated villages. He was forced to flee Laos in 1974 when the Communist Pathet Lao gained control of the country.

== Volunteer ==
In 1958, Buell volunteered with the International Voluntary Services (IVS) at the salary of sixty-five dollars a month. In May 1960, he left Indiana for an orientation course in Washington, D.C., and then flew to Laos (his first time out of the United States) for his new job.

In Laos, Pop (as he came to be universally known) was assigned to a small village about 100 miles north of Vientiane on the Plain of Jars. He lived in a hut without plumbing or electricity, his life there reminding him of growing up on the farm in Indiana.

== The Laotian Civil War ==
In the early 1960s the CIA was building up its secret Hmong army on the Plain of Jars where Buell lived. Laos' isolation and low international profile changed dramatically with a coup d'état in 1960 and the entry of Laos on the world stage as a pawn in the Cold War struggle between the United States and the Soviet Union.

Buell became involved in the Laotian Civil War between the Royalist government, supported by the United States, and the Communist Pathet Lao. Increasingly, both the United States and North Vietnam intervened militarily in Laos to protect their toehold in the country. Unlike Vietnam, where the US sent more than 500,000 soldiers, only a few Americans, civilian and military, worked in Laos. The CIA supported local efforts to fight the Pathet Lao, made up largely of Hmong and other highlanders and Pop Buell was the man on the scene who knew the Hmong and had their trust. Many Laotians were displaced by the fighting or, in the case of the highlanders, cut off in their mountaintop villages. To Buell, now working for the U.S. Agency for International Development, fell the task of organizing relief aid to refugees and isolated villagers. Frequently, the aid was in the form of bags of rice air dropped by Air America aircraft. Air America was the CIA owned civilian airline operating in Southeast Asia. Buell became a "one-man supply corps."

Buell became involved with the CIA largely through circumstance with his volunteer activities. Buell downplayed his CIA role. Although it was not central to his mission, he was one integral part of the CIA program in the Plain of Jars where the CIA was building up a Hmong resistance. To increase the Hmong tribes' effectiveness as a military force, Buell helped strengthen the Hmong economy by using his agricultural skills to improve Hmong techniques for planting and cultivating opium. Buell told the Hmong, "If you're gonna grow it, grow it good, but don't let anybody smoke the stuff." As a result, opium production increased. Buell supplied modern day medicine to the Hmong. Because of this, local opium consumption for medical purposes declined. This made more opium available for international markets.

Buell took money out of his retirement fund to buy supplies when U.S. government funds and resources were interrupted, as they often were at the far end of the supply chain. He was known to the Hmong as Tan Pop, "Uncle Pop". His opinion about the war in Laos was that it was for the Hmong to defend themselves against North Vietnam's Pathet Lao, pointing out "for every Hmong that died, one fewer American soldier died" in Vietnam. Many thousands of Hmong died in the war. He became one of several seldom-seen but mythical figures of the war in Laos—which is almost always described as "secret".

== Later life ==
The Hmong army held off the North Vietnamese and Pathet Lao for many years, but with the Paris Peace Accords of 1973 U.S. military aid and most economic aid to Laos ceased. The position of the Hmong army and the Royalist government became increasingly untenable. In 1974, Pop was out of a job with the Hmong and the U.S. government. He worked briefly as a teacher in Vientiane, but the American Embassy there soon learned that his name was on a list of people to be murdered by the Pathet Lao and the North Vietnamese who were completing their conquest of the country. Continental Air Services, Inc. pilot Les Strouse evacuated Buell from Laos by dressing him in a pilot's uniform, driving him to the airport, and flying him to Bangkok, Thailand. Everything Pop owned fit into three suitcases. Pop lived in Bangkok the rest of his life. He died 29 December 1980, while visiting a friend in Manila, Philippines. He is buried beside his wife Mattie in Edon Cemetery, Edon, Ohio.

In 1967, author John Steinbeck remarked during a visit to Laos. "I think Pop is an example of how the ancient Gods were born... Whether you believe it or not, there are still giants in the earth."
