= Ryan W. Buell =

American academic

- Education: University of Michigan Ross School of Business (2000); Harvard Business School (2007)
- Occupation: Academic
- Employer: Harvard Business School

Ryan W. Buell is an American academic who currently serves as the C.D Spangler Professor of Business Administration at the Harvard Business School. He has published research on economic redistribution and service management.
