= Buell Children's Museum =

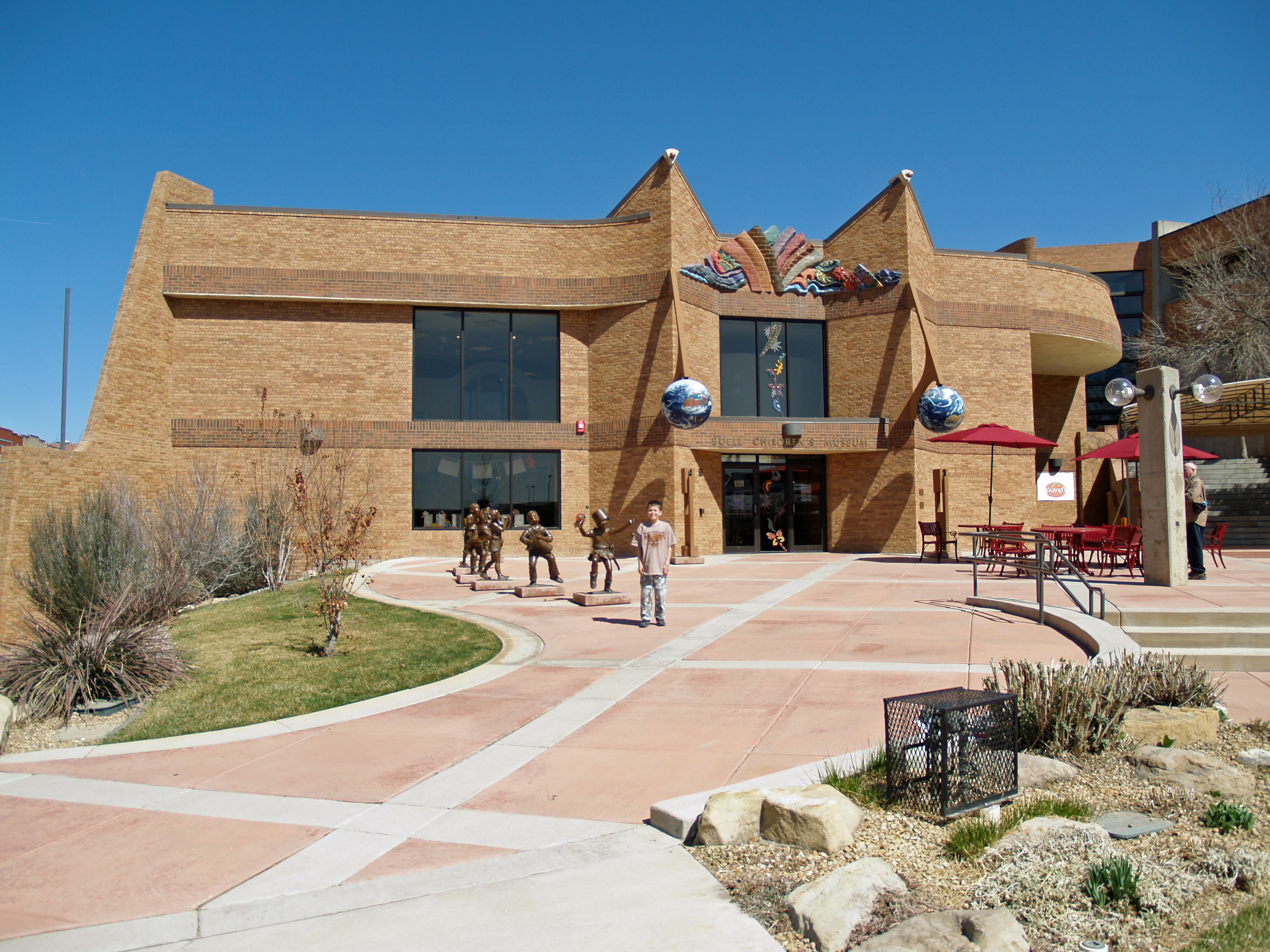
- Buell Children's Museum.
- Established: 2000
- Location: Pueblo, Colorado
- Coordinates: 38°16′10.15″N 104°36′24.04″W
- Type: Children's museum
- Accreditation: American Alliance of Museums
- Curator: Jerica Khosla
- Website: www.buellchildrensmuseum.org

The Buell Children's Museum is a children's museum in Pueblo, Colorado, United States that offers hands-on exhibits focusing on the arts, science and history.

The Museum is accredited as a part of The Sangre de Cristo Arts and Conference Center by the American Alliance of Museums (AAM), and is affiliated with the Association of Children's Museums.

== History ==
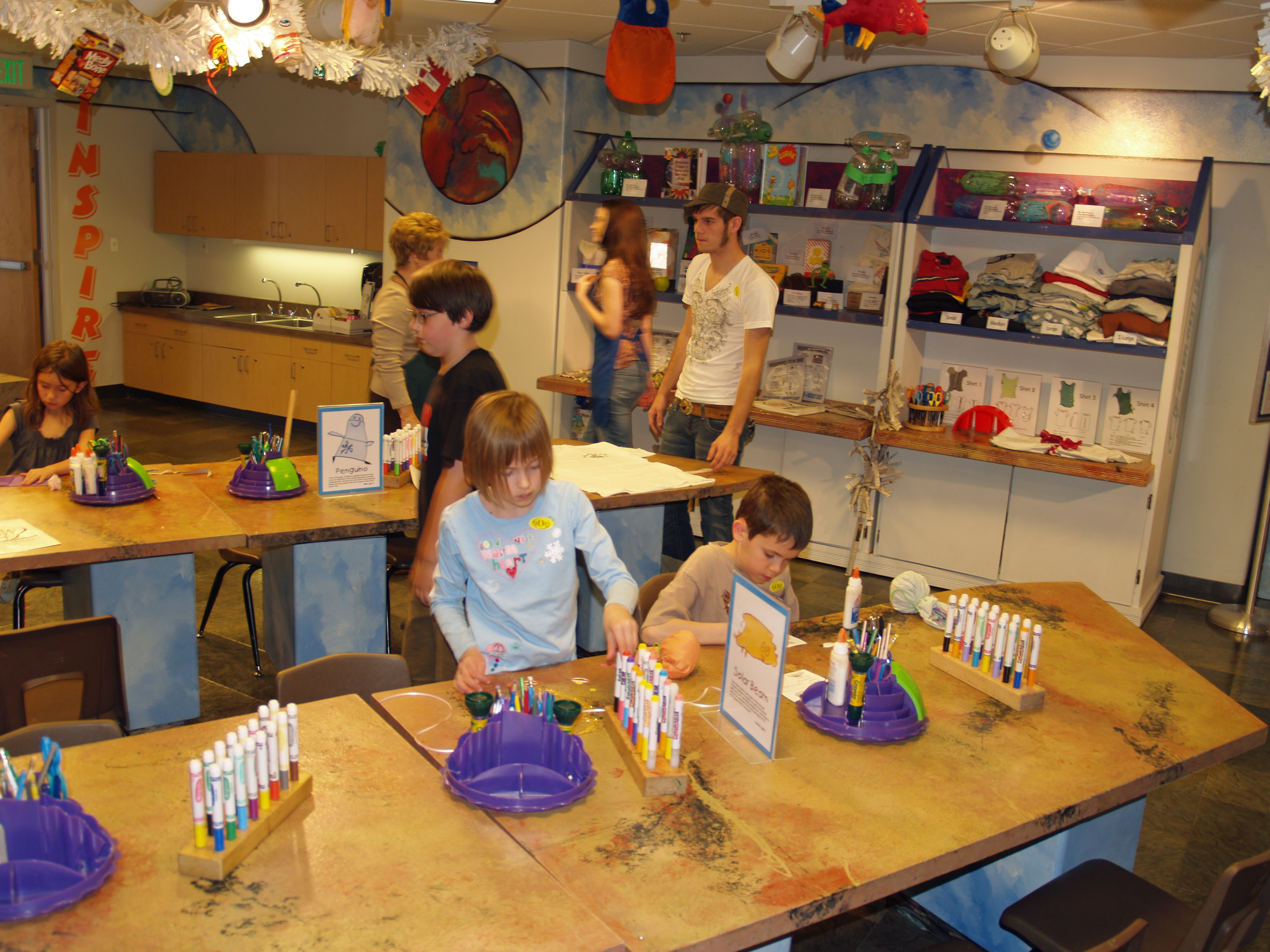
Buell Children's Museum Art Room

The Buell Children's Museum is a part of The Sangre de Cristo Arts & Conference Center which opened in 1972, with funding provided by the Economic Development Administration and Pueblo County.

In 1982, an expansion, funded by Puebloan Helen T. White, added three galleries, a gift shop and a small precursor children's museum.

In 2000, a further expansion added the 12,000 square-foot, two-level Buell Children's Museum and the Jackson Sculpture Garden. The Buell Children's Museum offers 7,500 square feet of interactive gallery space, a theater, a café and a gift shop.

== Exhibits ==
- The Reilly Family Gallery offers changing, hands-on exhibitions.
- Sensations is a high-tech, multi-sensory exhibit in which visitors activate lights, sound clips and videos.
- The El Pomar Magic Carpet Theater allows visitors to watch a program or star in their own theatrical production.
- The Artrageous Studio allows visitors to create arts & crafts.
- The Buell Baby Barn has activities for those under four, in a barnyard theme.

== Awards ==
In 2002 Child Magazine recognized the museum as the number two arts-related children's museum in the country.

In 2004, the museum was named the winner of the Award of Excellence in Arts & Humanities by the El Pomar Foundation.

Voted the Best Museum in Pueblo by The Pueblo Chieftain readers seven years in a row - 2012, 2013, 2014, 2015, 2016 & 2017.
