= Temple Hoyne Buell =

American architect (1895-1990)

- Born: September 9, 1895; Chicago, Illinois, United States
- Died: January 5, 1990 (aged 94); Denver, Colorado, US
- Education: University of Illinois Urbana-Champaign; Columbia University
- Occupation: Architect
- Spouse: Marjorie McIntosh
- Relatives: Thomas Hoyne (great-grandfather)
- Practice: Buell & Company
- Military career
- Allegiance: United States of America
- Branch: Army
- Rank: First Lieutenant
- Conflicts: Battle of Château-Thierry (1918)

Temple Hoyne Buell (September 9, 1895 – January 5, 1990) was an American architect, real estate developer and entrepreneur namesake of the Buell Theatre in Denver Center Complex, Buell & Company, and the Temple Buell Foundation.

Buell was born to a prominent Chicago family and the great-grandson of Thomas Hoyne. After graduating from Lake Forest Academy, he studied architecture at University of Illinois at Urbana-Champaign and completed graduate studies at Columbia University. He served in France during World War I. In the battle of Château-Thierry, he was exposed to phosgene. In 1921, he moved to Denver, Colorado for treatment of tuberculosis. After he regained his health he established the largest architectural firm in the Rocky Mountain area.

He was responsible for the design and/or construction of some of the state's most distinguished buildings, including Lincoln, Kennedy, Regis and Mann schools; some of the buildings on the University of Colorado campus in Boulder; the new Customs House downtown and the Paramount Theater - Denver's Art-Deco show-case. Over 300 buildings in Colorado were designed by Buell. He designed the first ever shopping mall in 1949, which is now called the Cherry Creek Shopping Center.

Buell was the 16th National President of Chi Psi fraternity.

His charitable contributions have led to many buildings being named after him. In addition to numerous examples in Colorado, Temple Hoyne Buell Hall on the Urbana campus of the University of Illinois houses the graduate division of the School of Architecture, as well as the Department of Landscape Architecture and the Department of Urban and Regional Planning. The Temple Hoyne Buell Foundation emphasizes programs and initiatives for children, especially in the areas of early intervention, prevention, and improvement of the social and educational systems critical to the well-being of Colorado's youngest citizens.

The Temple Hoyne Buell Center for the Study of American Architecture at Columbia University was established in 1982 through a beneficent gift from Buell, along with the Kaplan Foundation and Phyllis Lambert. The Buell Center's founding director was Robert A. M. Stern. Buell Hall at the university is named for him.

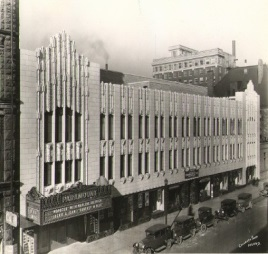
The Paramount Theatre, built by Buell in 1930.

Temple Buell was inducted into the Colorado Business Hall of Fame by Junior Achievement-Rocky Mountain and the Denver Metro Chamber of Commerce in 2013.
