= Alice Standish Buell =

American printmaker

- Born: Alice Standish; February 4, 1892; Oak Park, Illinois, U.S.
- Died: March 18, 1960 (aged 68); New York City, New York, U.S.
- Education: Oberlin College, Art Students League of New York
- Occupation(s): Artist, printmaker
- Known for: Painting, etching
- Spouse: Josiah Bradley Buell (m. 1917–1960; death)

Alice Standish Buell (February 4, 1892 – March 18, 1960) was an American artist and printmaker. She was active in Chicago and New York City.

Buell studied at Oberlin College and graduated with a B.A. degree in 1914, and at the Art Students League of New York. She was married to social worker, Josiah Bradley Buell in 1917. In the 1920s she worked for the YWCA organization. She also served as a director and later vice president of the Art Students League of New York.

Her artwork is included in the collections of the Whitney Museum of American Art the Metropolitan Museum of Art, and the National Gallery of Art.
