= Buell (given name) =

Buell is a masculine given name which may refer to:

- Buell F. Jones (1892–1947), American attorney and 11th attorney general of South Dakota
- Buell Kazee (1900–1976), American country and folk singer
- Buell Neidlinger (1936–2018), American cellist and double bassist
- Buell A. Nesbett (1910–1993), American soldier, lawyer, businessman and first chief justice of the Alaska Supreme Court
- Buell Quain (1912–1939), American ethnologist
