= Monty Buell =

American historian

Montgomery (Monty) Buell is the former chair of the Department of History and Philosophy at Walla Walla University in College Place, Washington, as well as current Professor of History.

A 1990 graduate of what was then Walla Walla College, Buell joined the Walla Walla University faculty in 1996 after completing his masters at Purdue University one year earlier. At Walla Walla University, Buell teaches U.S. History, American Intellectual History, American Economy, and Emergence of Modern America. Walla Walla University presented Buell with the President's Award for Excellence in Teaching in 2008.

Monty Buell has given various presentations such as “A Consuming Faith: The Economic Consequences of Cultural Values,” which was presented at Walla Walla University and “A Woman’s Place is Sliming Fish: Work Cultures in Alaska’s Commercial Fisheries,” given at a Pacific Northwest History conference in Portland, Oregon. Buell is a member of the steering committee for “Global Change, Local Challenge: A Community Conference on How We Can Prepare for the Local Impacts of Global Warming and Declining Oil Production.” He also wrote Status of Pacific Salmon and Their Role in North Pacific Ecosystems, a publication of the U.S. Delegation to the North Pacific Anadromous Fish Commission of which Buell is also a member.
