= Denver Dry Goods Company Building =

Coordinates: 39.7449°N 104.9931°W

- U.S. National Register of Historic Places
- Colorado State Register of Historic Properties
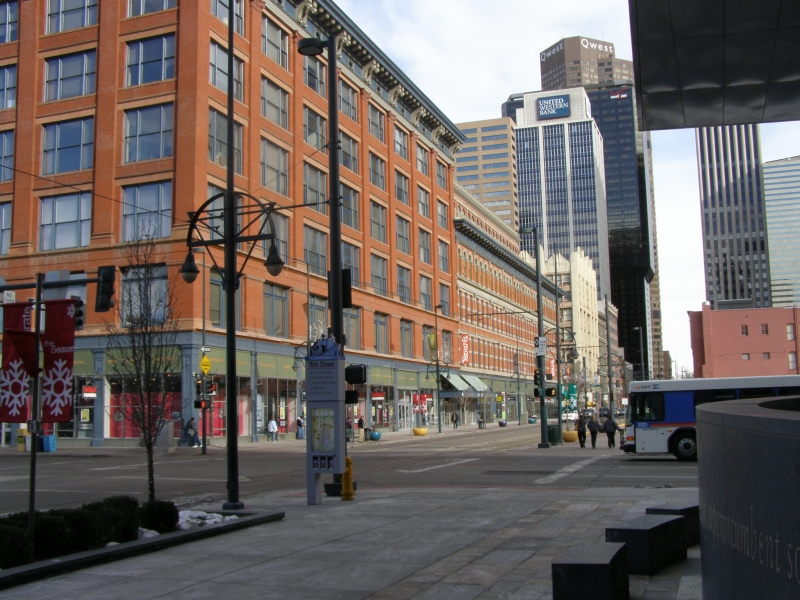
- Location: 16th St. and California St., Denver, Colorado
- NRHP reference No.: 78000843
- CSRHP No.: 5DV.135
- Added to NRHP: 1978-01-09

The Denver Dry Goods Company Building is a historic department store building located in downtown Denver, Colorado. For a while, the store was claimed to be the largest department store west of Chicago. A description on one postcard from 1916 read: "The Largest Store in the Central West, 400 Feet long-Seven Acres Floor Area, 1,200 Employees, A $1,500,000 Stock, 15th to 16th on California Street Denver Colorado".

The flagship store of The Denver Dry Goods Company, the retailer was part of Associated Dry Goods, and under ADG the downtown Denver store was renovated. Many Colorado residents fondly recall the stores' motto, "Where Colorado Shops With Confidence." The store was acquired by May Company as part of Associated Dry Goods Corp. in 1986.

Originally built in 1889, the store was expanded in 1898, 1906 and 1924. It was converted to apartments in 1994.

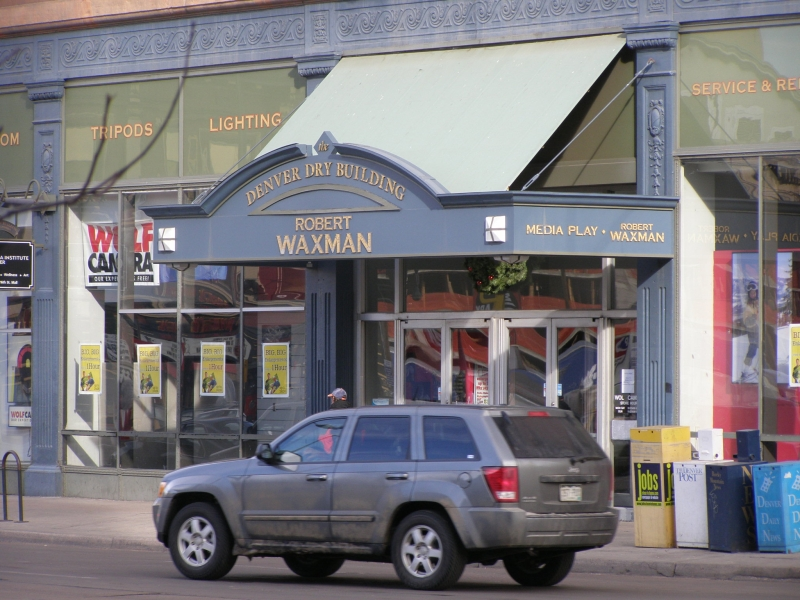
Covered entrance to the Denver Dry Goods Building on California Street

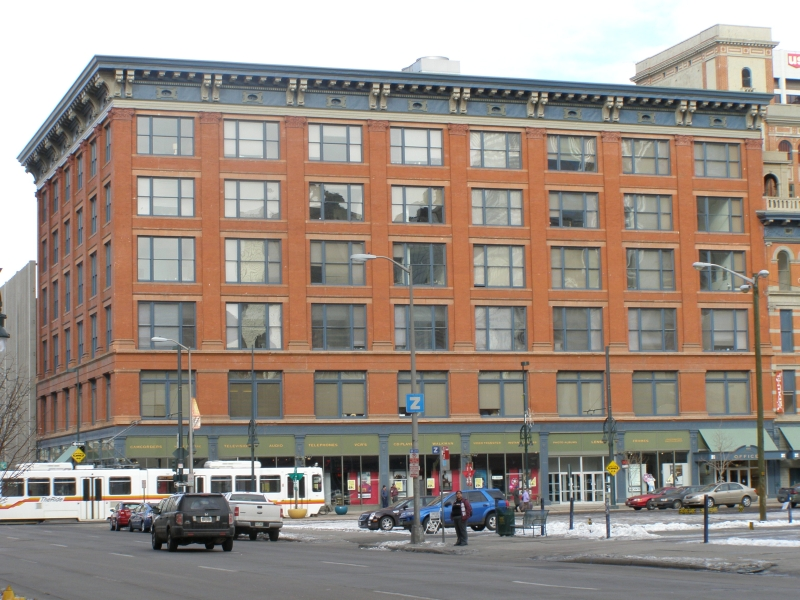
Denver Dry Goods Building (15th and California Streets)
