= Stewart–Hills House =

Historic house in Utah, United States

- U.S. National Register of Historic Places
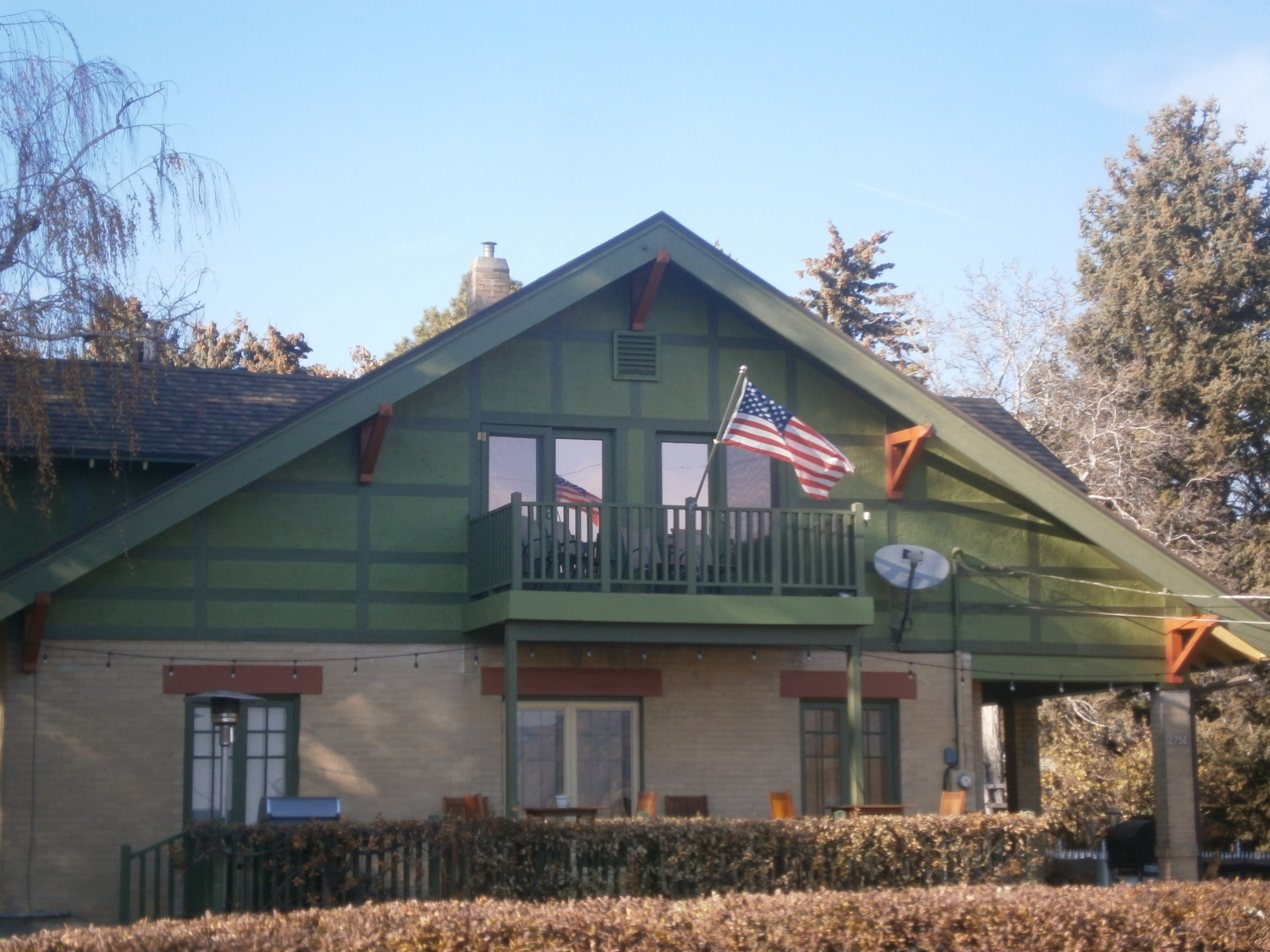

- Location within Utah Location within the United States
- Location: 275 East 2000 South, Orem, Utah
- Coordinates: 40°15′40″N 111°41′16″W
- Area: 0.4 acres (0.16 ha)
- Built: c.1915-c.1919
- Architectural style: Bungalow/craftsman
- MPS: Orem, Utah MPS
- NRHP reference No.: 03001483
- Added to NRHP: January 21, 2004

The Stewart–Hills House is a historic house located at 275 East 2000 South in Orem, Utah was built in 1915.

== Description and history ==
The 1 1/2-story house was designed in Bungalow/craftsman style, and was constructed over a period from about 1915 to about 1919.

It was begun by Dr. Andrew Jackson Stewart, who purchased the land in 1914. He began construction with intention to use it as a sanatorium or long-term care facility.

Dr. Stewart, born in 1873 in Provo, was educated at Brigham Young University and was on the staff of the Dr. Groves LDS Hospital in Salt Lake City. He married Helena Roseberry Young in Salt Lake City in 1901. He became a well-known physician and surgeon in Utah County. They had three children, the first born in Provo in 1903, the next two born in Mt. Pleasant, in 1905 and 1908. After living in this house, newly constructed, for a short period, Dr. Stewart dies from pneumonia in 1919. Clinton N. Hills purchased the house in 1920, when it was vacant and was complete on the first floor only. The Hills moved in and finished the second floor to add additional bedroom space. They also gradually modernized the house, adding electricity around 1925 and installing a bathroom on the first floor around 1932. This was one of the first indoor bathrooms in the area; one of the Hills children remembers neighbors stopping by to admire it.

It was listed on the National Register of Historic Places in 2004. The listing included three contributing buildings.
