= The Denver Dry Goods Company =

Department store in Denver, Colorado, US

The Denver Dry Goods Co.
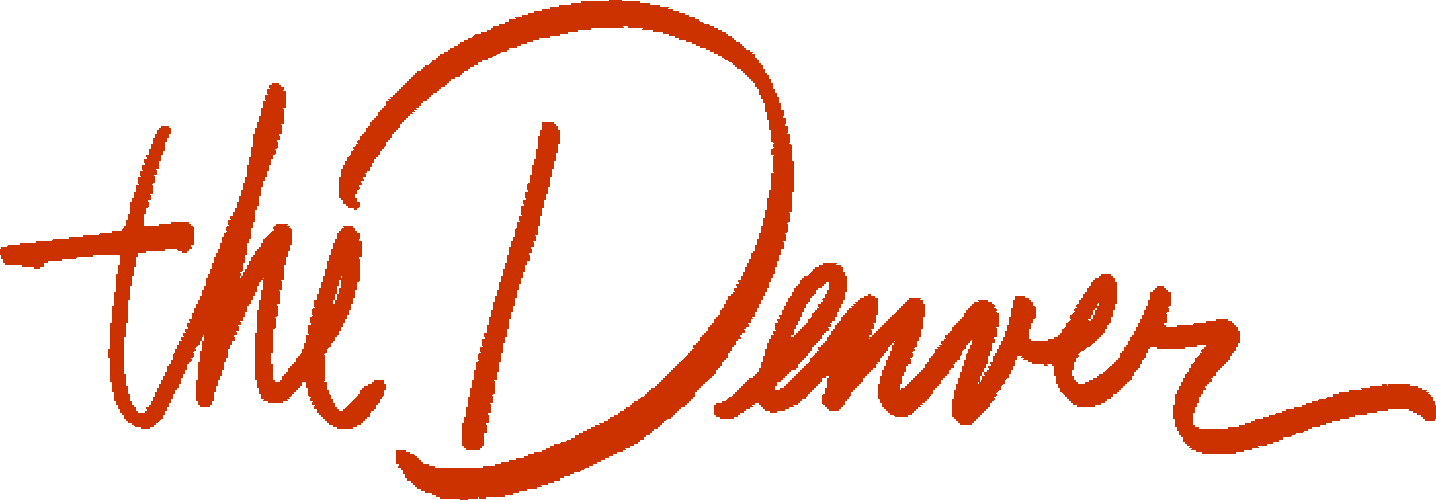
- Company type: Former subsidiary of Associated Dry Goods
- Industry: Retail
- Founded: 1879
- Defunct: 1987
- Fate: Merged with May D&F
- Successor: May D&F (1987–1993); Foley's (1993–2006); Macy's (since 2006)
- Headquarters: Denver, Colorado
- Products: Clothing, footwear, bedding, furniture, jewelry, beauty products and housewares

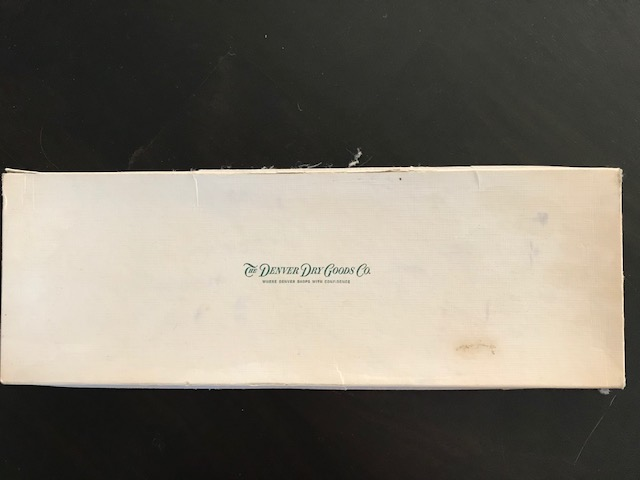
Denver Dry Goods box from the 1950s

The Denver Dry Goods Company, also known as "The Denver", was a department store which was established in the Denver Dry Goods Company Building in Denver, Colorado, in 1879 by Michael J. McNamara and L. H. Flanders as M. J. McNamara & Company. The firm was purchased and renamed to The McNamara Dry Goods Company in 1886 at 70 cents on the dollar. The new store opened on October 11, 1886. The beginnings of the company can be traced back to 1876 when they had both worked as clerks at another dry goods store in Denver. In 1877, McNamara left that store and formed a partnership with Edgar H. Drew. After two years, Drew left and L. H. Flanders came in as co-owner. In 1893, McNamara turned the store's ownership over to Dennis Sheedy and Charles Kountz and, in 1894, the company was reorganized under the name, "Denver Dry Goods Company". For a while, it was claimed to be the largest department store west of Chicago. A description on one postcard from 1916 read, "The Largest Store in the Central West, 400 Feet long-Seven Acres Floor Area, 1,200 Employees, A $2,500,000 Stock, 15th to 16th on California Street Denver Colorado."

The Denver Dry Goods Company later became part of Associated Dry Goods (ADG) and, in the 1970s and early 1980s, it was considered one of ADG's most profitable operating units, just behind Lord and Taylor. ADG invested in expanding The Denver, both with suburban stores in the greater Denver market and stores in far-flung locales such as Billings, Montana. Also under ADG, the downtown Denver store was renovated. Many Colorado residents fondly recall the store's motto, "Where Colorado Shops With Confidence".

The store was acquired by May Company as part of Associated Dry Goods Corp. in 1986 (which had acquired it in 1966). Nine of the 12 locations were shut down and sold off and the remaining three units were converted to May-Daniels & Fisher stores in 1987. The original downtown store was built in 1889 and was expanded in 1898, 1906 and 1924. It was converted to apartments in 1994. There were four additional closed units in Greeley, Billings and Lakeside and a short-lived free standing cosmetics store in Beau Monde (Denver Tech Center).

== See also ==
- List of defunct department stores of the United States
