= Lewis S. Hills House (425 E. 100 South) =

Historic house in Salt Lake City, Utah, United States

- U.S. National Register of Historic Places
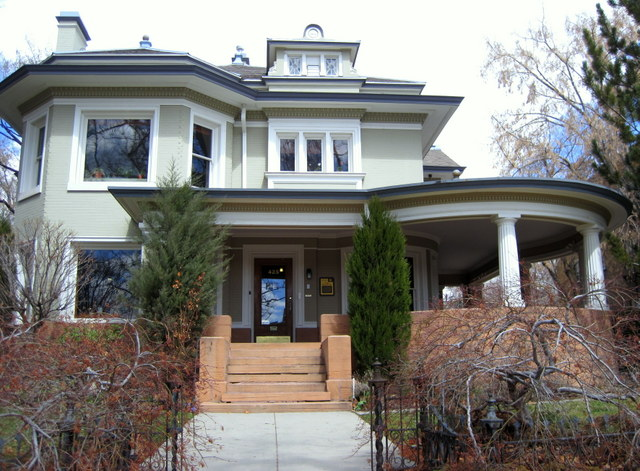
- The Lewis S. Hills House, April 2010

- Location within Utah Location within the United States
- Location: 425 East 100 South; Salt Lake City, Utah; United States
- Coordinates: 40°46′3″N 111°52′41″W
- Area: less than one acre
- Built: c. 1905
- Architectural style: Classical Revival, Late Victorian
- NRHP reference No.: 90001141
- Added to NRHP: August 3, 1990

The Lewis S. Hills House is a historic residence in Salt Lake City, Utah, United States, that is listed on the National Register of Historic Places (NRHP).

== Description ==
The house is located at 425 East 100 South and was built in about 1905.

The structure is significant for its association with Lewis S. Hills, a financier who, among other activities, served as bank president of Deseret National Bank. This house "represents the zenith of Hills' career, having been constructed while he was bank president", and was his home until his 1915 death. The 425 East 100 South house is also significant architecturally as "an excellent local example of the Victorian Eclectic style and as one of the few remaining houses in this East First South neighborhood, which was a fashionable residential area during the late nineteenth and early twentieth centuries." Two other houses in Salt Lake City and the area, including the NRHP-listed house of the same name, also are associated with Hills.

The structure was listed on the NRHP August 3, 1990. The listing included two contributing buildings and is distinct from Lewis S. Hills House, which located at 126 S. 200 West in Salt Lake City and is also listed on the NRHP.

== See also ==
- National Register of Historic Places listings in Salt Lake City, Utah
