= Lewis S. Hills House (126 S. 200 West) =

Historic house in Salt Lake City, Utah, United States

- U.S. National Register of Historic Places
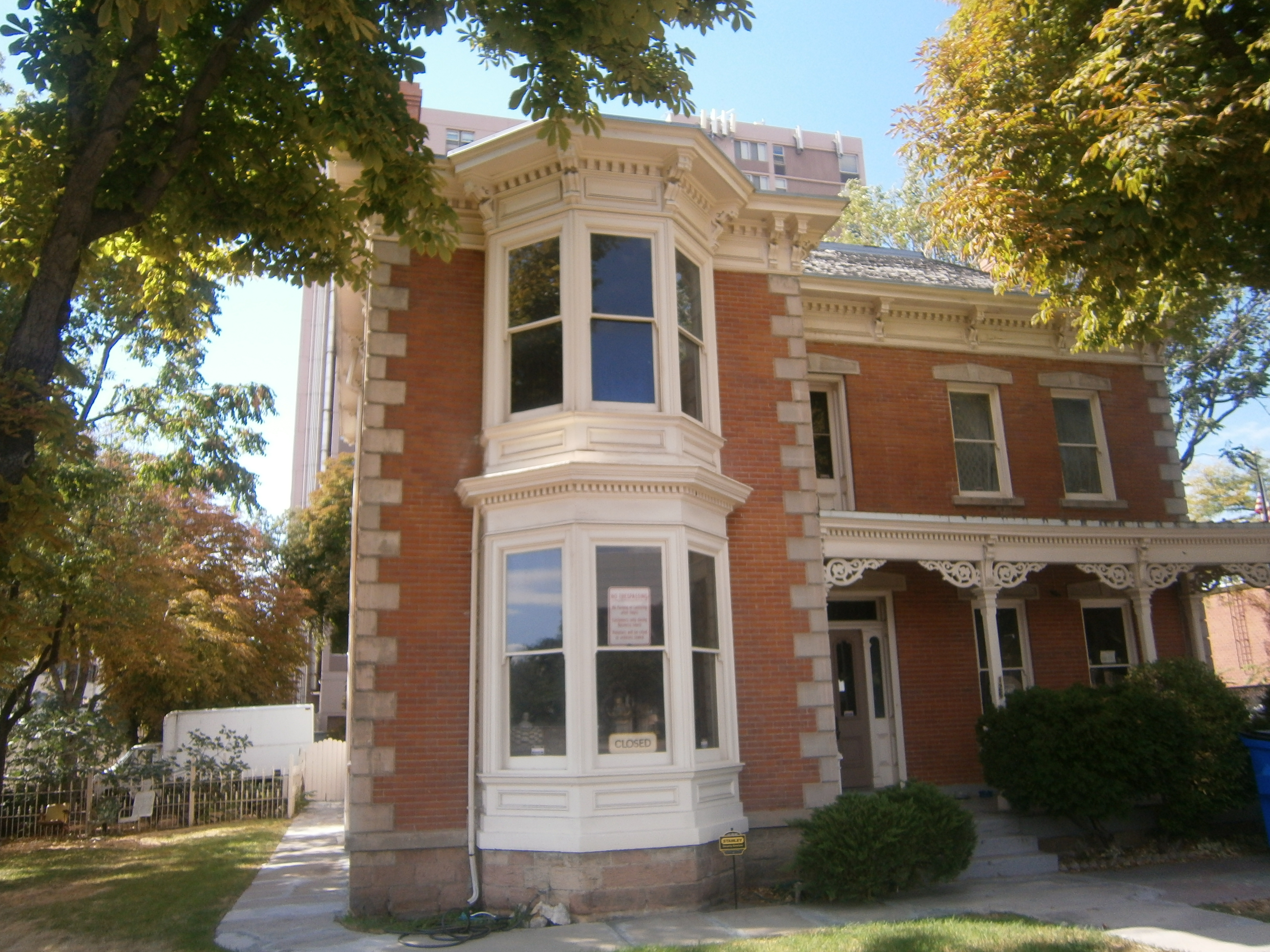
- The structure now houses an antique store, September 2016

- Location within Utah Location within the United States
- Location: 126 South 200 West; Salt Lake City, Utah; United States
- Coordinates: 40°46′0″N 111°53′47″W
- Area: less than one acre
- Built: 1885
- Architectural style: Italianate, High Victorian Italianate
- NRHP reference No.: 77001307
- Added to NRHP: August 18, 1977

The Lewis S. Hills House is a historic residence in Salt Lake City, Utah, United States, that is listed on the National Register of Historic Places (NRHP).

== Description ==
The house, which has also been known as the Hogan Hotel, is located at 126 South 200 West and was built in 1885. It is a "High Victorian Italianate" style house. From 1928 until the 1970s, the Hogar Hotel was a gathering place for Basque migrants. The structure is significant for its association with Lewis S. Hills, a financier who, among other activities, served as bank president of Deseret National Bank.

The structure was listed on the NRHP August 18, 1977. The residence is distinct from Lewis S. Hills House, which located at 425 East 100 South in Salt Lake City and is also listed on the NRHP.

== See also ==
- National Register of Historic Places listings in Salt Lake City, Utah
