= May-Daniels & Fisher =

American department store chain

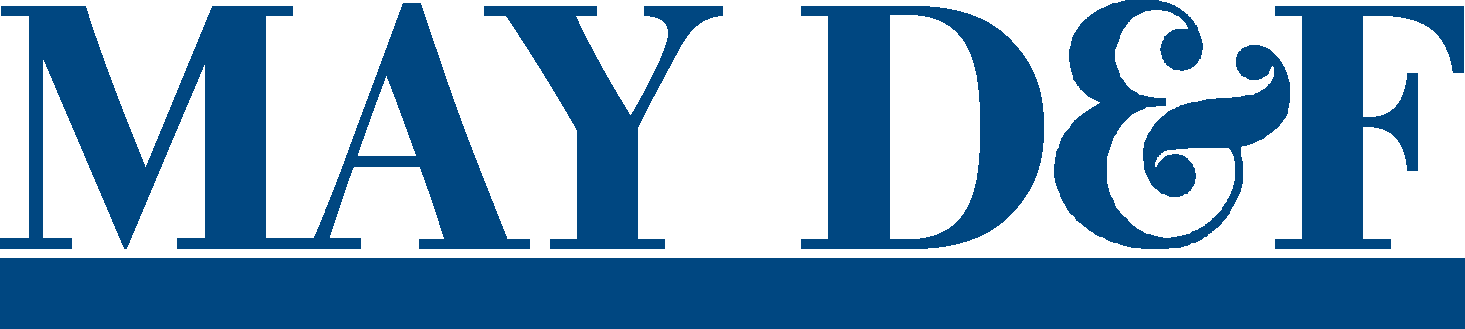

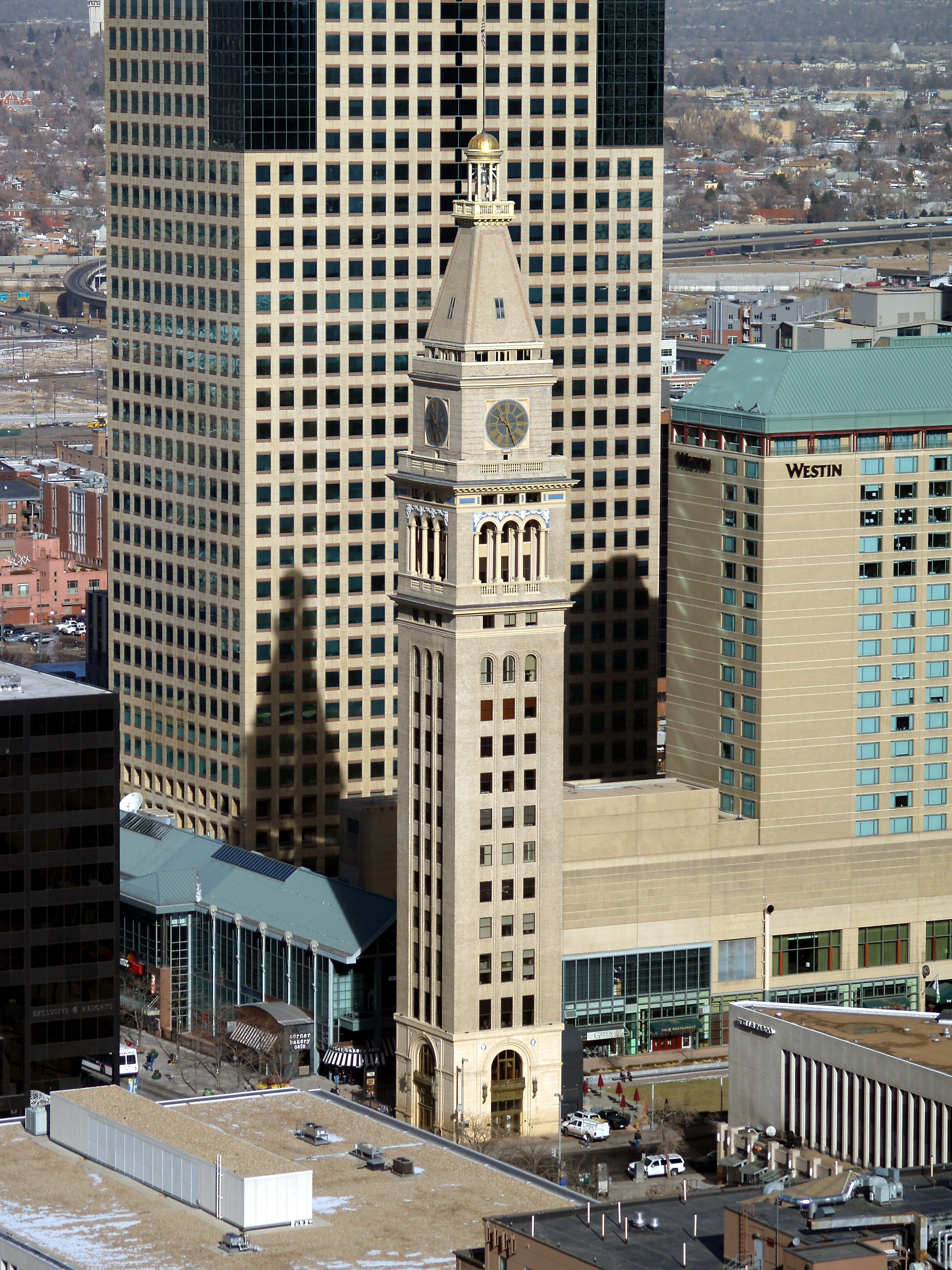
- Exterior of the Daniels & Fisher Tower, built with the former flagship store in Denver (2009)
- Trade name: May–D&F (Note: The May–D&F trade name was occasionally spelled without the hyphen.)
- Company type: Division
- Industry: Retail
- Genre: Department stores
- Predecessors: May Company Colorado; The Daniels & Fisher Co.
- Founded: 1957; 68 years ago in Denver, Colorado, United States
- Founder: David May
- Defunct: 1993; 32 years ago
- Fate: Rebranded by The May Department Stores Company
- Successor: Foley's
- Parent: The May Department Stores Company

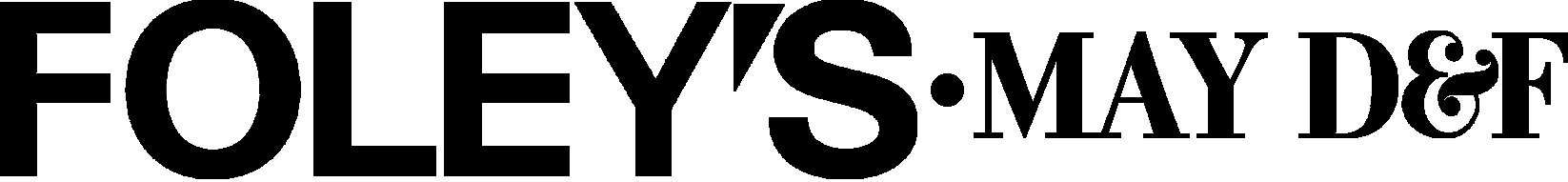
Foley's/May–D&F transition logo

May-Daniels & Fisher (doing business as May–D&F) was an American department store chain headquartered in Denver, Colorado. It was established by David May with the 1957 merger of The Daniels & Fisher Co. (founded in 1864 in Denver) and the May Company Colorado (founded in 1877 in Leadville).

In 1987, May D&F absorbed three stores from The Denver Dry Goods Company (from the 1986 acquisition of Associated Dry Goods Corp.) and closed the other nine, and in 1989, it assumed the Goldwater's location in Albuquerque, New Mexico. It was merged into the Foley's division in 1993, which was absorbed by Macy's in 2005 when it purchased the May Department Stores Co. The last remaining remnant of this store is the landmark Daniels & Fisher clock tower in downtown Denver which once anchored the Daniels & Fisher store. It opened in 1910 and closed in 1957 when the new May-D&F store opened further up 16th Street at Courthouse Square (Zeckendorf Plaza). The primary May Company store, built in 1906 and expanded in 1924, was demolished in 1965 for an expansion of the Colorado National Bank building. A mid-priced chain, it competed with The Denver Dry Goods Company and Joslin's for customers.

== See also ==
- List of defunct department stores of the United States
- List of department stores converted to Macy's
