= Buell Hall =

Academic building at Columbia University

Coordinates: 40°48′27.83″N 73°57′41.04″W

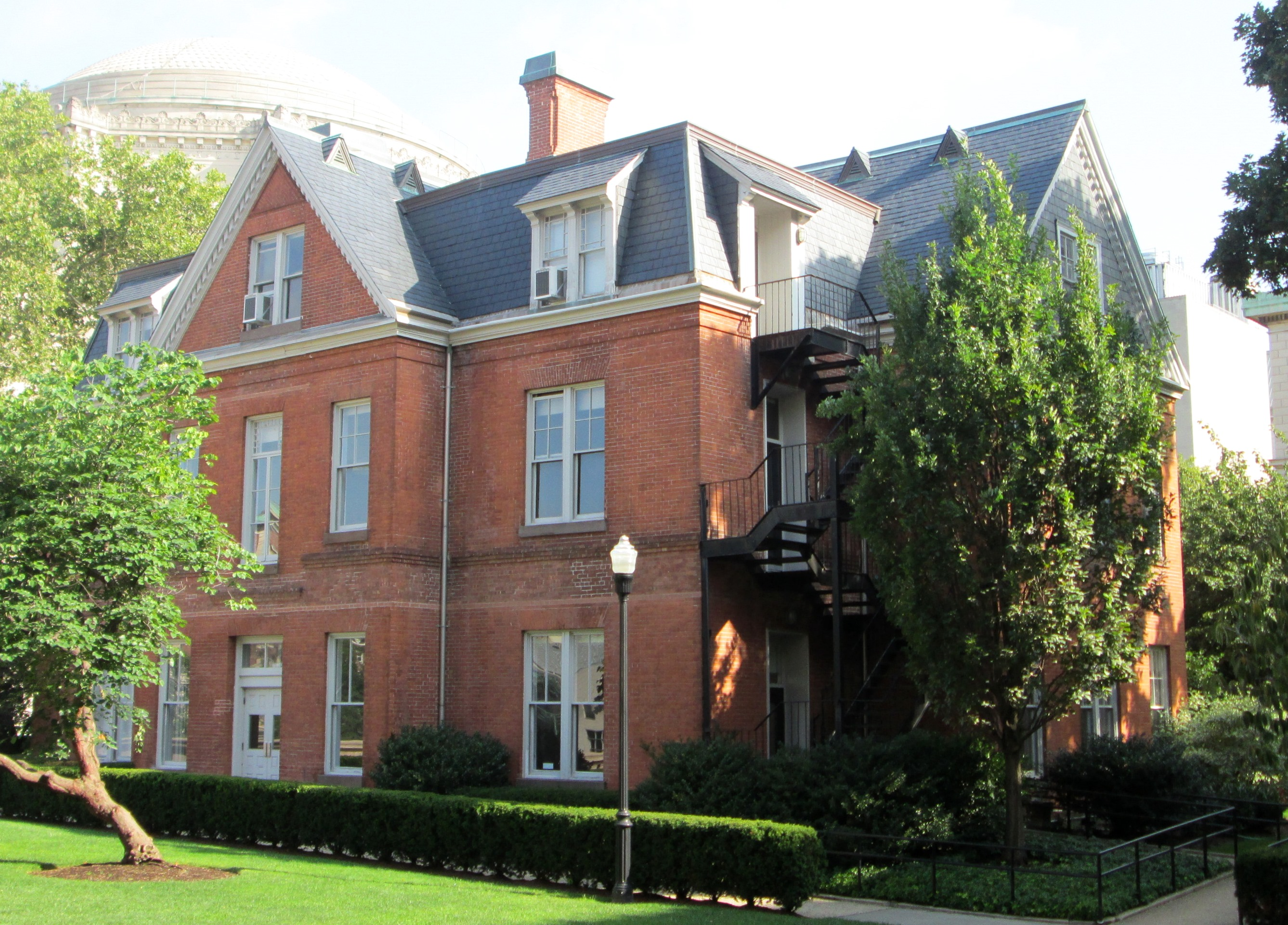
Buell Hall

Buell Hall is an academic building on the Morningside Heights campus of Columbia University in New York City. Built in 1885 as Macy Villa, it is the oldest building on Columbia's campus, and the last remaining building at Columbia which dates back to the Bloomingdale Insane Asylum, on whose grounds the university is now located. It now houses La Maison Française, the oldest French cultural center on an American university campus, as well as the Temple Hoyne Buell Center for the Study of American Architecture of the Columbia Graduate School of Architecture, Planning and Preservation.

== History ==
Buell Hall was constructed in 1885 on a plot between 116th and 120th streets to serve as a home for the Bloomingdale Insane Asylum's wealthy, male patients. Designed by Ralph Townsend, it was originally named Macy Villa, after businessman William H. Macy. In 1892, the hospital sold the building and the land on which it sat to Columbia University, which was in the process of relocating from its Madison Avenue campus to its current location in Morningside Heights. It was renamed College Hall, and was used for a short period of time by the Columbia men's crew team beginning in 1895, after which it housed Columbia College until the completion of Hamilton Hall in 1907.

Upon the completion of Hamilton Hall, College Hall was physically moved back in order to make room for Kent Hall, and was renamed East Hall. Over the next half century it would house various parts of the university administration, as well as the Alumni Council. In 1956 it became the main building for the Columbia University School of General Studies. The Maison Française, its current occupant, moved in during 1977. It was finally renamed Buell Hall in 1983 after architect and alumnus Temple Hoyne Buell, who donated $5 million towards the creation of the Temple Hoyne Buell Center for the Study of American Architecture; the center moved into Buell Hall in 1990, following an extensive renovation of the building.
