= Buhler (surname) =

Buhler, Buehler, or Bühler are surnames of German origin. They are derived from the German noun Bühl, meaning "hill", with the suffix -er, and is thus a topographic surname for a person living on or next to a hill.

== Notable people with the name ==
=== Buhler ===
- Carlos Buhler (born 1954), American mountaineer
- Charlie Buhler, American director
- Cynthia von Buhler (born 1964), American artist and author
- Joe P. Buhler (born 1950), American mathematician
- Larry Buhler (1917–1990), American football player
- Mark Buhler (born 1954), American politician
- Rich Buhler (1946–2012), American radio host and pastor
- Robert Buhler (1916–1989), Swiss artist
- Victor Buhler (born 1972), American film producer

=== Bühler ===
- Adolf Bühler (1822–1896), Swiss industrialist and philanthropist
- Adolf Bühler Jr. (1869–1939), Swiss industrialist, philanthropist and politician
- Anton Bühler (1922–2013), Swiss equestrian
- Arnaud Bühler (born 1985), Swiss footballer
- Beate Bühler (born 1964), German beach volleyball player
- Charlotte Bühler (1893–1974), German-American psychologist
- Christophe Bühler (borny 1974), Swiss swimmer
- Curt F. Bühler (1905–1985), American librarian
- Dagmar Bühler-Nigsch (born 1969), Liechtenstein politician
- David Bühler (1872–1938), Liechtenstein politician
- Erhard Bühler (born 1956), German army general
- Georg Bühler (1837–1898), German Indologist
- Hans Adolf Bühler (1877–1951), German painter
- Hans Bühler (1893–1967), Swiss equestrian
- Hedy Hahnloser-Bühler (1873–1952), Swiss painter and art collector
- Helmut Bühler (born 1957), Liechtenstein politician
- Johannes Bühler (born 1997), German footballer
- Josef Bühler (1904–1948), German lawyer and Nazi official
- Josua Bühler (1895–1983), Swiss philatelist
- Judith Bühler (born 1972), Dutch politician
- Julian Bühler (born 21985), Swiss footballer
- Karin Karinna Bühler (born 1974), Swiss visual artist
- Karl Bühler (1879–1963), German psychologist
- Karl August Bühler (1904–1984), German politician
- Klaus Bühler (1941–2021), German politician
- Luana Bühler (born 1996), Swiss footballer
- Léna Bühler (born 1997), Swiss racing driver
- Manfred Bühler (born 1979), Swiss lawyer and politician
- Manuel Bühler (born 1983), Colombian-Swiss footballer
- Marcelle Bühler (1913–2002), Swiss alpine skier
- Mario Bühler (born 1992), Swiss footballer
- Marta Bühler (born 1951), Liechtenstein alpine skier
- Matthias Bühler (born 1986), German sprinter
- Michel Bühler (1945–2022), Swiss singer-songwriter and playwright
- Oswald Bühler (1899–1962), Liechtenstein politician
- Ottmar Bühler (1884–1965), German jurist and university professor
- Otto Bühler, Swiss footballer
- Philippe Bühler (born 1981), German musician
- René Bühler (1905–1987), Swiss businessman, industrialist and politician
- Richard Bühler (1915–1959), Swiss ski jumper
- Rolf Bühler (1942–2025), Swiss javelin thrower
- Romy Bühler (born 1994), Swiss figure skater
- Silke Bühler-Paschen, German-Austrian physicist and university professor
- Theodor Bühler-Lindenmeyer (1859–1899), Swiss pharmacist and ornithologist
- Urs Bühler (born 1971), Swiss tenor
- Ursula Bühler Hedinger (1943–2009), Swiss aviation pioneer
- Winfried Bühler (1929–2010), German psychologist

=== Buehler ===
- Al Buehler, American track and cross-country coach
- Antonio Buehler, American educator, entrepreneur, and activist
- Betty Buehler (1921–2012), American film actress
- Calvin Adam Buehler (1896–1988), American chemist and university professor
- David Buehler (born 1987), American football player
- David Buehler (politician), American politician
- Edward Buehler Delk (1885–1956), American architect
- George Buehler (born 1947), American football player
- Herbert J. Buehler (1927–2007), American educator and politician
- Ken Buehler (1919–2019), American basketball player
- Knute Buehler (born 1964), American physician and politician
- Markus J. Buehler (born 1977), American materials scientist
- Martin Buehler, American electrical engineer
- Rachel Buehler (born 1985), American soccer player
- Randy Buehler (born 1971), American businessman
- Walker Buehler (born 1994), American baseball player
- William Buehler Seabrook (1884–1945), American occultist, explorer, traveller, and journalist

== See also ==
- Buhler (disambiguation)
- Bühl (surname)
