= Josua =

Josua or Jozua is a male given name and a variation of the Hebrew name Yeshua. Notable people with this name include:

- Josua Bühler (1895–1983), Swiss philatelist
- Josua de Grave (1643–1712), Dutch draughtsman and painter
- Josua Harrsch (1669–1719), German missionary
- Josua Hoffalt (born 1984), French ballet dancer
- Josua Järvinen (1871–1948), Finnish politician
- Josua Koroibulu (born 1982), Fijian rugby league footballer
- Josua Heschel Kuttner (c. 1803–1878), Jewish Orthodox scholar and rabbi
- Josua Lindahl (1844–1912), Swedish-American geologist and paleontologist
- Josua Maaler (1529–1599), Swiss pastor and lexicographer
- Josua Mateinaniu (fl. 1835), Fijian missionary
- Josua Mejías (born 1997), Venezuelan footballer
- Johann Josua Mosengel (1663–1731), German pipe organ builder
- Jozua Naudé (disambiguation), several people
- Josua Swanepoel (born 1983), South African cricketer
- Josua Tuisova (born 1994), Fijian rugby union player
- Josua Vakurunabili (born 1992), Fijian rugby union player
- Josua Vici (born 1994), Fijian rugby union player
- Josua Waghubinger

== See also ==
- Joshua (name)
