= René Bühler =

Swiss Businessman

René Bühler PhD
- René Bühler (1975)

Member of the National Council (Switzerland)
- In office December 3, 1951 – December 6, 1959

Personal details
- Born: Max René Bühler; July 6, 1905 Uzwil, St. Gallen, Switzerland
- Died: March 26, 1987 (aged 81) St. Gallen, St. Gallen, Switzerland
- Party: Free Democratic Party
- Spouse: Madeleine Robert-dit-Rose (m. 1940)
- Children: 2
- Education: ETH Zurich (Diploma); University of Cambridge (PhD)
- Occupation: Businessman, industrialist and politician

Max René Bühler (/bɒɒhlər/ boo-hler July 6, 1905 - March 26, 1987) was a Swiss businessman, industrialist and politician. He served on the National Council (Switzerland) for the Free Democratic Party (FDP) between 1951 and 1959. He previously served on the municipal council of Uzwil between 1948 and 1951.

Bühler was a controlling shareholder of Bühler Brothers, which was established in 1860, by his grandfather Adolf Bühler Sr. Bühler was on the board of directors of Credit Suisse, Sulzer, Schlieren (today part of Stadler Rail), Oerlikon, Hasler as well as a board director of several economic non-profit organizations such as Swissmem.

== Early life and education ==
Bühler was born July 6, 1905, in Henau (today part of Uzwil), to Adolf Bühler Jr. and Alice (née Forter) Bühler. His father was the eldest son of industrial pioneer Adolf Bühler, who founded Bühler Brothers in 1860. His mother hailed from a banking family from St. Gallen. Bühler attended the local schools and then studied mechanical engineering at the ETH Zürich and University of Cambridge. He was a diplomed production engineer and also held a PhD in Engineering.

== Career ==
In 1932, Bühler entered the family business where he initially focussed on the development of machinery used in grist mills. After the death of his father Adolf Bühler Jr., he became a partner and ultimately sole shareholder of the group.

== Politics ==
He served on the municipal council of Uzwil between 1948 and 1951. In the 1951 Swiss federal election, Bühler was elected into National Council (Switzerland) for the Free Democratic Party. He assumed office on December 3, 1951, and served until leaving office on December 6, 1959.

== Personal life ==
Bühler married Madeleine Robert-dit-Rose (d. 1996) and had two sons;

- Max Heinrich Bühler (d. 1987), attorney and president of Bühler Japan
- Urs Felix Bühler (1943-2025), who would ultimately become the sole owner of Bühler Group; three daughters who now all hold positions within Bühler.

== Awards ==
- Honorary Doctorate in economics, University of St. Gallen (1962)
