= 2017–18 TSG 1899 Hoffenheim season =

1899 Hoffenheim
2017–18 season
- President: Peter Hofmann
- Manager: Julian Nagelsmann
- Stadium: Wirsol Rhein-Neckar-Arena
- Bundesliga: 3rd
- DFB-Pokal: Second round
- UEFA Champions League: Play-off round
- UEFA Europa League: Group stage
- Top goalscorer: League: Mark Uth (14 goals); All: Mark Uth (17 goals)
- Biggest win: Hoffenheim 6–0 Köln
- Biggest defeat: Bayern 5–2 Hoffenheim
Home colours	Away colours	Third colours
- All statistics correct as of 21 May 2018.

The 2017–18 TSG 1899 Hoffenheim season is the 119th season in the football club's history and 10th consecutive and overall season in the top flight of German football, the Bundesliga, having been promoted from the 2. Bundesliga in 2008. In addition to the domestic league, 1899 Hoffenheim also is participating in this season's editions of the domestic cup, the DFB-Pokal, and the first-tier continental cup, the UEFA Champions League.

This is the 10th season for Hoffenheim in the Wirsol Rhein-Neckar-Arena, located in Sinsheim, Baden-Württemberg, Germany. The season covers a period from 1 July 2017 to 30 June 2018.

== Players ==
=== Squad information ===
As of 31 January 2018

Note: Flags indicate national team as defined under FIFA eligibility rules; some limited exceptions apply. Players may hold more than one non-FIFA nationality.

No.	Pos.	Nation	Player
1	GK	GER	Oliver Baumann
3	DF	CZE	Pavel Kadeřábek
4	DF	BIH	Ermin Bičakčić
6	MF	NOR	Håvard Nordtveit
7	MF	GER	Lukas Rupp
8	MF	POL	Eugen Polanski (captain)
10	MF	GER	Kerem Demirbay
11	MF	AUT	Florian Grillitsch
16	DF	GER	Nico Schulz
17	MF	SUI	Steven Zuber
18	MF	GER	Nadiem Amiri
19	FW	GER	Mark Uth
20	MF	AUT	Robert Žulj
21	DF	GER	Benjamin Hübner (3rd captain)
22	MF	GER	Kevin Vogt (vice-captain)
24	DF	NED	Justin Hoogma

No.	Pos.	Nation	Player
25	DF	GER	Kevin Akpoguma
26	FW	GER	David Otto
27	FW	CRO	Andrej Kramarić
28	FW	HUN	Ádám Szalai
29	MF	GER	Serge Gnabry (on loan from Bayern Munich)
31	DF	GER	Felix Passlack (on loan from Borussia Dortmund)
32	MF	GER	Dennis Geiger
33	GK	GER	Alexander Stolz
35	MF	MNE	Meris Skenderović
36	GK	SUI	Gregor Kobel
37	MF	GER	Robin Hack
38	DF	AUT	Stefan Posch
41	DF	GER	Johannes Bühler
42	DF	GER	Alexander Rossipal
—	GK	CRO	Marko Marić

== Competitions ==
Win Draw Loss

=== Overview ===
Competition	First match	Last match	Starting round	Final position	Record							
Competition	First match	Last match	Starting round	Final position	Pld	W	D	L	GF	GA	GD	Win %
Bundesliga	19 August 2017	12 May 2018	Matchday 1	3rd	34	15	10	9	66	48	+18	44.12
DFB-Pokal	12 August 2017	25 October 2017	First round	Second round	2	1	0	1	1	1	+0	50.00
Champions League	15 August 2017	23 August 2017	Play-off round	Play-off round	2	0	0	2	3	6	−3	0.00
Europa League	14 September 2017	7 December 2017	Group stage	Group stage	6	1	2	3	8	10	−2	16.67
Total					44	17	12	15	78	65	+13	38.64

Last updated: 21 May 2018
Source: Competitions

=== Bundesliga ===
==== League table ====
Pos	Team	Pld	W	D	L	GF	GA	GD	Pts	Qualification or relegation
1	Bayern Munich (C)	34	27	3	4	92	28	+64	84	Qualification for the Champions League group stage
2	Schalke 04	34	18	9	7	53	37	+16	63	Qualification for the Champions League group stage
3	1899 Hoffenheim	34	15	10	9	66	48	+18	55	Qualification for the Champions League group stage
4	Borussia Dortmund	34	15	10	9	64	47	+17	55	Qualification for the Champions League group stage
5	Bayer Leverkusen	34	15	10	9	58	44	+14	55	Qualification for the Europa League group stage

Source: DFB
Rules for classification: 1) Points; 2) Goal difference; 3) Goals scored; 4) Head-to-head results; 5) Head-to-head away goals scored; 6) Away goals scored; 7) Play-off.
(C) Champions

==== Results summary ====
Overall								Home						Away					
Pld	W	D	L	GF	GA	GD	Pts	W	D	L	GF	GA	GD	W	D	L	GF	GA	GD
34	15	10	9	66	48	+18	55	11	4	2	38	16	+22	4	6	7	28	32	−4

Last updated: 21 May 2018.
Source: Bundesliga

==== Results by round ====
Round	1	2	3	4	5	6	7	8	9	10	11	12	13	14	15	16	17	18	19	20	21	22	23	24	25	26	27	28	29	30	31	32	33	34
Ground	H	A	H	H	A	H	A	H	A	H	A	H	A	H	A	H	A	A	H	A	A	H	A	H	A	H	A	H	A	H	A	H	A	H
Result	W	D	W	D	W	W	L	D	D	L	W	D	L	W	L	W	L	D	L	L	D	W	L	D	W	W	D	W	D	W	W	W	L	W
Position	5	5	2	5	3	2	3	4	4	7	5	6	7	5	6	5	7	7	9	9	9	8	9	9	7	7	7	7	7	6	5	4	4	3

Updated to match(es) played on 21 May 2018. Source: Bundesliga
A = Away; H = Home; W = Win; D = Draw; L = Loss

==== Matches ====
19 August 2017 1	1899 Hoffenheim	1–0	Werder Bremen	Sinsheim
15:30 CEST (UTC+2)	Kramarić 84'	Report		Stadium: Wirsol Rhein-Neckar-Arena; Attendance: 30,150; Referee: Guido Winkmann

26 August 2017 2	Bayer Leverkusen	2–2	1899 Hoffenheim	Leverkusen
15:30 CEST (UTC+2)	Wendell 32' (pen.); Bellarabi 49'	Report	Kramarić 47'; Uth 70'	Stadium: BayArena; Attendance: 27,106; Referee: Harm Osmers

9 September 2017 3	1899 Hoffenheim	2–0	Bayern Munich	Sinsheim
18:30 CEST (UTC+2)	Uth 27', 51'	Report		Stadium: Wirsol Rhein-Neckar-Arena; Attendance: 30,150; Referee: Daniel Siebert

17 September 2017 4	1899 Hoffenheim	1–1	Hertha BSC	Sinsheim
13:30 CEST (UTC+2)	Wagner 6'	Report	Esswein 55'	Stadium: Wirsol Rhein-Neckar-Arena; Attendance: 27,243; Referee: Markus Schmidt

20 September 2017 5	Mainz 05	2–3	1899 Hoffenheim	Mainz
20:30 CEST (UTC+2)	Latza 5'; Mutō 16'	Report	Amiri 23'; Wagner 45+1'; Uth 90+2'	Stadium: Opel Arena; Attendance: 23,477; Referee: Manuel Gräfe

23 September 2017 6	1899 Hoffenheim	2–0	Schalke 04	Sinsheim
15:30 CEST (UTC+2)	Geiger 13'; Rupp 90+3'	Report		Stadium: Wirsol Rhein-Neckar-Arena; Attendance: 30,150; Referee: Sascha Stegemann

1 October 2017 7	SC Freiburg	3–2	1899 Hoffenheim	Freiburg
13:30 CEST (UTC+2)	Niederlechner 15'; Söyüncü 18'; Stenzel 87'	Report	Hack 14'; Schuster 90+1' (o.g.)	Stadium: Schwarzwald-Stadion; Attendance: 24,000; Referee: Daniel Siebert

14 October 2017 8	1899 Hoffenheim	2–2	FC Augsburg	Sinsheim
15:30 CEST (UTC+2)	Hübner 52'; Uth 85'	Report	Gregoritsch 75'; Vogt 89' (o.g.)	Stadium: Wirsol Rhein-Neckar-Arena; Attendance: 27,014; Referee: Manuel Gräfe

22 October 2017 9	VfL Wolfsburg	1–1	1899 Hoffenheim	Wolfsburg
18:00 CEST (UTC+2)	Uduokhai 90+1'	Report	Demirbay 73' (pen.)	Stadium: Volkswagen Arena; Attendance: 23,514; Referee: Felix Zwayer

28 October 2017 10	1899 Hoffenheim	1–3	Borussia Mönchengladbach	Sinsheim
15:30 CEST (UTC+2)	Demirbay 25'	Report	Hazard 61'; Ginter 79'; Vestergaard 82'	Stadium: Wirsol Rhein-Neckar-Arena; Attendance: 30,150; Referee: Harm Osmers

5 November 2017 11	1. FC Köln	0–3	1899 Hoffenheim	Cologne
15:30 CET (UTC+1)		Report	Geiger 9'; Wagner 56' (pen.), 80'	Stadium: RheinEnergieStadion; Attendance: 49,200; Referee: Deniz Aytekin

18 November 2017 12	1899 Hoffenheim	1–1	Eintracht Frankfurt	Sinsheim
15:30 CET (UTC+1)	Uth 90+1'	Report	Boateng 13'	Stadium: Wirsol Rhein-Neckar-Arena; Attendance: 30,150; Referee: Felix Zwayer

26 November 2017 13	Hamburger SV	3–0	1899 Hoffenheim	Hamburg
15:30 CET (UTC+1)	Akpoguma 6' (o.g.); Kostić 75'; Jung 88'	Report		Stadium: Volksparkstadion; Attendance: 46,470; Referee: Bastian Dankert

2 December 2017 14	1899 Hoffenheim	4–0	RB Leipzig	Sinsheim
15:30 CET (UTC+1)	Amiri 13'; Gnabry 52', 62'; Uth 87'	Report		Stadium: Wirsol Rhein-Neckar-Arena; Attendance: 28,299; Referee: Daniel Siebert

10 December 2017 15	Hannover 96	2–0	1899 Hoffenheim	Hanover
15:30 CET (UTC+1)	Füllkrug 59'; Harnik 85'	Report		Stadium: HDI-Arena; Attendance: 36,800; Referee: Markus Schmidt

13 December 2017 16	1899 Hoffenheim	1–0	VfB Stuttgart	Sinsheim
18:30 CET (UTC+1)	Uth 81'	Report		Stadium: Wirsol Rhein-Neckar-Arena; Attendance: 30,150; Referee: Bibiana Steinhaus

16 December 2017 17	Borussia Dortmund	2–1	1899 Hoffenheim	Dortmund
18:30 CET (UTC+1)	Aubameyang 63' (pen.); Pulisic 89'	Report	Uth 21'	Stadium: Signal Iduna Park; Attendance: 81,000; Referee: Harm Osmers

13 January 2018 18	Werder Bremen	1–1	1899 Hoffenheim	Bremen
15:30 CET (UTC+1)	Gebre Selassie 63'	Report	Hübner 39'	Stadium: Weser-Stadion; Attendance: 37,500; Referee: Robert Hartmann

20 January 2018 19	1899 Hoffenheim	1–4	Bayer Leverkusen	Sinsheim
15:30 CET (UTC+1)	Szalai 86'	Report	Bailey 43'; Baumgartlinger 51'; Alario 70', 90+3'	Stadium: Wirsol Rhein-Neckar-Arena; Attendance: 28,017; Referee: Patrick Ittrich

27 January 2018 20	Bayern Munich	5–2	1899 Hoffenheim	Munich
15:30 CET (UTC+1)	Lewandowski 21'; Boateng 25'; Coman 63'; Vidal 66'; Wagner 90'	Report	Uth 3'; Gnabry 12'	Stadium: Allianz Arena; Attendance: 75,000; Referee: Manuel Gräfe

3 February 2018 21	Hertha BSC	1–1	1899 Hoffenheim	Berlin
15:30 CET (UTC+1)	Kalou 58'	Report	Kramarić 38' (pen.)	Stadium: Olympiastadion Berlin; Attendance: 32,598; Referee: Deniz Aytekin

10 February 2018 22	1899 Hoffenheim	4–2	Mainz 05	Sinsheim
15:30 CET (UTC+1)	Szalai 27', 74'; Kramarić 67', 88'	Report	Berggreen 28', 80'	Stadium: Wirsol Rhein-Neckar-Arena; Attendance: 24,105; Referee: Benjamin Cortus

17 February 2018 23	Schalke 04	2–1	1899 Hoffenheim	Gelsenkirchen
18:30 CET (UTC+1)	Kehrer 11'; Embolo 28'	Report	Kramarić 78'	Stadium: Veltins-Arena; Attendance: 60,741; Referee: Benjamin Brand

24 February 2018 24	1899 Hoffenheim	1–1	SC Freiburg	Sinsheim
15:30 CET (UTC+1)	Kramarić 57'	Report	Petersen 66' (pen.)	Stadium: Wirsol Rhein-Neckar-Arena; Attendance: 30,150; Referee: Christian Dingert

3 March 2018 25	FC Augsburg	0–2	1899 Hoffenheim	Augsburg
15:30 CET (UTC+1)		Report	Kramarić 30'; Gnabry 50'	Stadium: WWK Arena; Attendance: 27,100; Referee: Patrick Ittrich

10 March 2018 26	1899 Hoffenheim	3–0	VfL Wolfsburg	Sinsheim
15:30 CET (UTC+1)	Schulz 18'; Gnabry 77'; Guilavogui 80' (o.g.)	Report		Stadium: Wirsol Rhein-Neckar-Arena; Attendance: 25,550; Referee: Manuel Gräfe

17 March 2018 27	Borussia Mönchengladbach	3–3	1899 Hoffenheim	Mönchengladbach
15:30 CET (UTC+1)	Drmić 33'; Stindl 72'; Ginter 90'	Report	Hübner 13'; Kramarić 58' (pen.); Grillitsch 73'	Stadium: Borussia-Park; Attendance: 51,049; Referee: Martin Petersen

31 March 2018 28	1899 Hoffenheim	6–0	1. FC Köln	Sinsheim
15:30 CEST (UTC+2)	Gnabry 22', 47'; Uth 56', 65'; Rupp 61'; Zuber 72'	Report		Stadium: Wirsol Rhein-Neckar-Arena; Attendance: 30,150; Referee: Robert Hartmann

8 April 2018 29	Eintracht Frankfurt	1–1	1899 Hoffenheim	Frankfurt
18:00 CEST (UTC+2)	Jović 49'	Report	Gnabry 56'	Stadium: Commerzbank-Arena; Attendance: 50,500; Referee: Daniel Siebert

14 April 2018 30	1899 Hoffenheim	2–0	Hamburger SV	Sinsheim
15:30 CEST (UTC+2)	Gnabry 18'; Szalai 27'	Report		Stadium: Wirsol Rhein-Neckar-Arena; Attendance: 30,150; Referee: Harm Osmers

21 April 2018 31	RB Leipzig	2–5	1899 Hoffenheim	Leipzig
15:30 CEST (UTC+2)	Keïta 59'; Upamecano 88'	Report	Uth 14', 59'; Gnabry 35'; Kadeřábek 45'; Rupp 64'	Stadium: Red Bull Arena; Attendance: 41,780; Referee: Tobias Welz

27 April 2018 32	1899 Hoffenheim	3–1	Hannover 96	Sinsheim
20:30 CEST (UTC+2)	Kramarić 16', 50', 86'	Report	Karaman 24'	Stadium: Wirsol Rhein-Neckar-Arena; Attendance: 26,452; Referee: Patrick Ittrich

5 May 2018 33	VfB Stuttgart	2–0	1899 Hoffenheim	Stuttgart
15:30 CEST (UTC+2)	Gómez 25', 74'	Report		Stadium: Mercedes-Benz Arena; Attendance: 58,312; Referee: Felix Zwayer

12 May 2018 34	1899 Hoffenheim	3–1	Borussia Dortmund	Sinsheim
15:30 CEST (UTC+2)	Kramarić 26'; Szalai 63'; Kadeřábek 73'	Report	Reus 58'	Stadium: Wirsol Rhein-Neckar-Arena; Attendance: 30,150; Referee: Manuel Gräfe

=== DFB-Pokal ===
12 August 2017 First round	Rot-Weiß Erfurt	0–1	1899 Hoffenheim	Erfurt
18:30 CEST (UTC+2)		Report	Amiri 55'	Stadium: Steigerwaldstadion; Attendance: 8,144; Referee: Daniel Siebert

25 October 2017 Second round	Werder Bremen	1–0	1899 Hoffenheim	Bremen
20:45 CEST (UTC+2)	Belfodil 30'	Report		Stadium: Weser-Stadion; Attendance: 31,210; Referee: Tobias Stieler

=== UEFA Champions League ===
==== Play-off round ====
15 August 2017 First leg	1899 Hoffenheim (Germany)	1–2	(England) Liverpool	Sinsheim, Germany
20:45 CEST (UTC+2)	Uth 87'	Report	Alexander-Arnold 35'; Nordtveit 74' (o.g.)	Stadium: Wirsol Rhein-Neckar-Arena; Attendance: 25,568; Referee: Björn Kuipers (Netherlands)

23 August 2017 Second leg	Liverpool (England)	4–2 (6–3 agg.)	(Germany) 1899 Hoffenheim	Liverpool, England
19:45 BST (UTC+1); 20:45 CEST (UTC+2)	Can 10', 21'; Salah 18'; Firmino 63'	Report	Uth 28'; Wagner 79'	Stadium: Anfield; Attendance: 51,808; Referee: Daniele Orsato (Italy)

=== UEFA Europa League ===
==== Group stage ====
Pos	Team	Pld	W	D	L	GF	GA	GD	Pts	Qualification	BRA	LUD	IBS	HOF
1	(Portugal) Braga	6	3	1	2	9	8	+1	10	Advance to knockout phase	—	0–2	2–1	3–1
2	(Bulgaria) Ludogorets Razgrad	6	2	3	1	7	5	+2	9	Advance to knockout phase	1–1	—	1–2	2–1
3	(Turkey) İstanbul Başakşehir	6	2	2	2	7	8	−1	8		2–1	0–0	—	1–1
4	(Germany) TSG Hoffenheim	6	1	2	3	8	10	−2	5		1–2	1–1	3–1	—

Source: UEFA
Rules for classification: Group stage tiebreakers

14 September 2017 1	1899 Hoffenheim (Germany)	1–2	(Portugal) Braga	Sinsheim, Germany
19:00 CEST (UTC+2)	Wagner 24'	Report	Teixeira 45+1'; Sousa 50'	Stadium: Wirsol Rhein-Neckar-Arena; Attendance: 15,714; Referee: Bobby Madden (Scotland)

28 September 2017 2	Ludogorets Razgrad (Bulgaria)	2–1	(Germany) 1899 Hoffenheim	Razgrad, Bulgaria
22:05 EEST (UTC+3); 21:05 CEST (UTC+2)	Dyakov 46'; Lukoki 72'	Report	Kadeřábek 2'	Stadium: Ludogorets Arena; Attendance: 6,155; Referee: Paweł Raczkowski (Poland)

19 October 2017 3	1899 Hoffenheim (Germany)	3–1	(Turkey) İstanbul Başakşehir	Sinsheim, Germany
21:05 CEST (UTC+2)	Hübner 52'; Amiri 59'; Schulz 75'	Report	Napoleoni 90+3'	Stadium: Wirsol Rhein-Neckar-Arena; Attendance: 21,167; Referee: Aleksei Yeskov (Russia)

2 November 2017 4	İstanbul Başakşehir (Turkey)	1–1	(Germany) 1899 Hoffenheim	Istanbul, Turkey
21:00 TRT (UTC+3); 19:00 CET (UTC+1)	Višća 90+3'	Report	Grillitsch 47'	Stadium: Başakşehir Fatih Terim Stadium; Attendance: 5,214; Referee: Harald Lechner (Austria)

23 November 2017 5	Braga (Portugal)	3–1	(Germany) 1899 Hoffenheim	Braga, Portugal
20:05 WET (UTC); 21:05 CET (UTC+1)	Marcelo Goiano 1'; Fransérgio 81', 90+3'	Report	Uth 74'	Stadium: Estádio Municipal; Attendance: 10,054; Referee: Andre Marriner (England)

7 December 2017 6	1899 Hoffenheim (Germany)	1–1	(Bulgaria) Ludogorets Razgrad	Sinsheim, Germany
19:00 CET (UTC+1)	Ochs 25'	Report	Wanderson 62'	Stadium: Wirsol Rhein-Neckar-Arena; Attendance: 7,814; Referee: Orel Grinfeld (Israel)

== Statistics ==
=== Appearances and goals ===
No.	Pos	Nat	Player	Total		Bundesliga		DFB-Pokal		Champions League		Europa League	
No.	Pos	Nat	Player	Apps	Goals	Apps	Goals	Apps	Goals	Apps	Goals	Apps	Goals
Goalkeepers
1	GK	(Germany) GER	Oliver Baumann	41	0	34	0	0	0	2	0	5	0
33	GK	(Germany) GER	Alexander Stolz	0	0	0	0	0	0	0	0	0	0
36	GK	(Switzerland) SUI	Gregor Kobel	3	0	0	0	2	0	0	0	1	0
Defenders
3	DF	(Czech Republic) CZE	Pavel Kadeřábek	34	3	24+4	2	0+1	0	2	0	3	1
4	DF	(Bosnia and Herzegovina) BIH	Ermin Bičakčić	13	0	7+2	0	1	0	1	0	2	0
16	DF	(Germany) GER	Nico Schulz	34	2	19+8	1	1+1	0	0	0	5	1
21	DF	(Germany) GER	Benjamin Hübner	32	4	27	3	1	0	2	0	1+1	1
24	DF	(Netherlands) NED	Justin Hoogma	2	0	0	0	0	0	0	0	2	0
25	DF	(Germany) GER	Kevin Akpoguma	23	0	17+5	0	1	0	0	0	0	0
31	DF	(Germany) GER	Felix Passlack	4	0	1+1	0	0	0	0	0	1+1	0
34	DF	(Germany) GER	Simon Lorenz	1	0	0	0	0	0	0	0	1	0
38	DF	(Austria) AUT	Stefan Posch	13	0	9	0	0	0	0	0	3+1	0
41	DF	(Germany) GER	Johannes Bühler	1	0	0	0	0	0	0	0	0+1	0
42	DF	(Germany) GER	Alexander Rossipal	1	0	0	0	0	0	0	0	1	0
Midfielders
6	MF	(Norway) NOR	Håvard Nordtveit	23	0	10+5	0	1	0	1+1	0	5	0
7	MF	(Germany) GER	Lukas Rupp	25	3	15+6	3	1	0	1	0	2	0
8	MF	(Poland) POL	Eugen Polanski	14	0	2+7	0	1	0	0	0	2+2	0
10	MF	(Germany) GER	Kerem Demirbay	27	2	13+6	2	2	0	2	0	4	0
11	MF	(Austria) AUT	Florian Grillitsch	29	2	21+4	1	1	0	0	0	3	1
17	MF	(Switzerland) SUI	Steven Zuber	27	1	17+3	1	1	0	2	0	3+1	0
18	MF	(Germany) GER	Nadiem Amiri	33	4	19+9	2	1	1	0+1	0	3	1
20	MF	(Austria) AUT	Robert Žulj	6	0	1+4	0	0	0	0	0	1	0
22	MF	(Germany) GER	Kevin Vogt	40	0	31	0	2	0	2	0	5	0
29	MF	(Germany) GER	Serge Gnabry	26	10	20+2	10	0+1	0	2	0	0+1	0
30	MF	(Germany) GER	Philipp Ochs	9	1	3	0	0+1	0	0	0	1+4	1
32	MF	(Germany) GER	Dennis Geiger	27	2	20+1	2	0+1	0	1	0	2+2	0
35	MF	(Montenegro) MNE	Meris Skenderović	1	0	0	0	0	0	0	0	0+1	0
37	MF	(Germany) GER	Robin Hack	5	1	1+2	1	1	0	0	0	1	0
Forwards
19	FW	(Germany) GER	Mark Uth	38	17	24+7	14	1+1	0	0+2	2	2+1	1
26	FW	(Germany) GER	David Otto	1	0	0	0	0	0	0	0	0+1	0
27	FW	(Croatia) CRO	Andrej Kramarić	42	13	22+12	13	2	0	2	0	4	0
28	FW	(Hungary) HUN	Ádám Szalai	20	5	8+10	5	0	0	0+1	0	0+1	0
Players transferred out during the season
14	FW	(Germany) GER	Sandro Wagner	17	6	10+1	4	1	0	2	1	3	1
15	DF	(Germany) GER	Jeremy Toljan	4	0	2	0	1	0	0+1	0	0	0

Last updated: 12 May 2018
Source: Competitions

== Transfers ==
=== Transfers in ===
Date	Pos.	Name	From	Fee	Ref.
20 June 2017	MF	Håvard Nordtveit (NOR)	West Ham United (ENG)	£8,000,000	
1 July 2017	MF	Florian Grillitsch	Werder Bremen	Free transfer	
8 July 2017	DF	Nico Schulz	Borussia Mönchengladbach	Undisclosed	

=== Loans in ===
Date from	Pos.	Name	From	Date until	Ref.
14 July 2017	FW	Serge Gnabry	Bayern Munich	End of season	
30 August 2017	DF	Felix Passlack	Borussia Dortmund	End of season	

=== Transfers out ===
Date	Pos.	Name	To	Fee	Ref.
30 August 2017	DF	Jeremy Toljan	Borussia Dortmund	Undisclosed	

=== Loans out ===
Date from	Pos.	Name	To	Date until	Ref.
10 January 2018	MF	Barış Atik (TUR)	Darmstadt 98	End of season	
