= Adolf Bühler Jr. =

Swiss industrialist, philanthropist and politician

Member of the Cantonal Council of St. Gallen
- In office 1898–1906

Personal details
- Born: Gustav Adolf Bühler; October 10, 1869 Uzwil, St. Gallen, Switzerland
- Died: April 19, 1939 (aged 69) Uzwil, St. Gallen, Switzerland
- Spouse: Alice Forter (m. 1903; died 1937)
- Children: 5
- Occupation: Industrialist, philanthropist and politician

Gustav Adolf Bühler commonly referred to as Adolf Bühler Jr. (/bɒɒhlər/ boo-hler October 10, 1869 - April 19, 1939) was a Swiss industrialist, philanthropist and politician. He was the eldest son of Adolf Bühler and majority owner of Bühler Brothers. Bühler served on the Cantonal Council of St. Gallen from 1898 to 1906 for the Free Radical Liberals. He was a member of the Bühler family.

== Early life and education ==
Bühler was born on October 10, 1869, the eldest of five sons to Adolf Bühler, Sr. and his wife Maria Seline Naef in Uzwil, Switzerland. He attended the local schools and studied mechanical engineering at ETH Zurich and Karlsruhe Institute of Technology.

== Career ==
After the sudden death of his father, Bühler took-over the family business, with then over 600 employees. He would be the one to build it into an internationally operating concern and diversify in various sectors such as machinery for the produce industry. He was also a major philanthropist creating several charitable organizations (such as UZE Association in 1926).

== Politics ==
Bühler became a municipal councilor of Uzwil in 1897 and held this position through to 1912. Between 1898 and 1906 he served on the Cantonal Council of St. Gallen as a legislator for the Free Radical Liberals.

== Personal life ==
In 1903, Bühler married Alice Forter (d. 1937), daughter of the banker Adolf Forter (1850–1920), who was a director for Unionbank St. Gallen. They had five children:

- Max René (July 6, 1905 – March 26, 1987), who was also a member of the National Council (Switzerland)
- Adolf, III. (May 7, 1904 – October 14, 1974)
- Nelly Marcelle (1913–2003) whom married Kaspar Reinhart
- Alice Elisabeth (1911–2002), who was married to James Schwarzenbach
- Felix Max (1916–1920)
