= Swissmem =

- Founded: 1883
- Headquarters: Zurich, Switzerland
- Members: over 1,400 companies (as at: 2024)
- Key people: Martin Hirzel (President) Stefan Brupbacher (CEO)
- Website: https://www.swissmem.ch/

Swissmem is the association of the Swiss technology industry (mechanical, electrical, metal, and related technology sectors). It represents the interests of the technology industries in the commercial, political and public spheres, and boosts the competitive capacity of its over 1,400 member companies with needs-based services. These include training and development courses for employees in the sector, consulting services, networks and a compensation fund.

Martin Hirzel has been President of Swissmem since 2021. Stefan Brupbacher has been its CEO since 2019.

Swissmem is headquartered in Zurich.

== History ==
The history of Swissmem began in 1883 with the founding of the Swiss Association of Machinery Manufacturers (VSM). The Association’s goal was: “To safeguard and promote the general interests of the Swiss engineering industry”. Consequently, the engineering industry employers established the Association of Swiss Engineering Employers (ASM) from the ranks of the VSM in 1905. The ASM’s purpose was to safeguard its members’ interests in the area of social policy. Both associations have been operating under the Swissmem name since 1999.

In September 2006, the ASM and VSM members voted in favour of continuing integration. In early 2007, the VSM became Swissmem and took on all of the ASM’s activities except those relating to the sector’s collective employment agreement (GAV). The ASM continues to exist legally as an independent organization and is a contractual partner in the collective employment agreement for the Swiss technology industries. The technology industries’ GAV traditionally blazes a trail for many other Swiss GAVs and has evolved from the “industrial peace agreement” of 1937 to the high-level agreement of today.

== Members ==
More than 1,400 companies are members of Swissmem. They include ABB, Bucher, Bühler, Geberit, Georg Fischer, Pilatus, Rieter, Schindler, Siemens, Stadler and many more. 85% of all Swissmem members are small and medium-sized enterprises (SMEs).

With around 329,000 employees, including more than 20,000 apprentices, the tchnology industries are among the biggest employers in Switzerland. They generate total annual sales of CHF 87.4 billion (2024). This equates to around 7% (2024) of GDP. The technology industries thus occupy a key position within the Swiss economy. The sector accounts for almost a third of Switzerland’s total goods exports, with a value of CHF 68.4 billion (2024).

== Services ==
=== Representation of interests ===
Swissmem is the voice of the Swiss technology industries in the commercial, political and public spheres, and campaigns for the sector on relevant matters. The association advocates for good economic policy framework conditions and a liberal labour market, and is committed to a constructive social partnership.

=== Training ===
From basic education, to inspirational seminars, to management training, Swissmem offers practice-oriented training opportunities at a wide variety of levels. Swissmem’s vocational training school is the centre of excellence for basic professional training for careers as a plant engineer, automation technician, automation fitter, design engineer, electronics technician, multi-skilled mechanic, production mechanic and mechanical practitioner. The centre of excellence supports businesses with a wide range of training offerings for apprentices and professionals. With the Swissmem Academy, the association maintains its own training centre. Its offering includes courses, seminars and in-house training sessions. In general, it is open to all. Special conditions are available for employees of Swissmem member companies.

=== Advice ===
Swissmem members can also access services such as professional advice on employment, commercial, contract and environmental law, energy efficiency, and knowledge and technology transfer.

=== Networking ===
Swissmem members are part of a broad industry network. The individual sub-sectors within the technology industries join together in a total of 28 industry sectors. Each industry sector organizes itself and enjoys a great deal of autonomy within Swissmem. One focus area for the industry sectors is that of sharing experiences and networking. They also collect market-relevant performance indicators and data. Marketing activities are important too, and many industry sectors are also members of European or global umbrella organizations.

Industry sectors:

- Power engineering transmission
- Assembly and factory automation
- Additive manufacturing
- Automotive
- Dimensional measurement
- Fluid technology
- Printing machinery
- Intralogistics, packaging and handling technology
- Compressors, pneumatic and vacuum technology
- Plastics machinery
- New energy systems
- Photonics
- Precision tools
- Pump technology
- Space
- Welding technology
- Swiss Additive Manufacturing Group
- Swiss Airport Suppliers
- SWISS ASD
- Textile machinery
- Transmission and distribution
- Environmental technology
- Internal combustion engines
- Process engineering equipment
- Die and mould industry
- Machine tools
- ZMIS/SSMI

Every year, Swissmem organizes the Swissmem Industry Day. Over 1,000 decision-makers from industry, business and politics meet to discuss topical issues and make use of networking opportunities.

=== Social partnership ===
In 1937, the ASM and the trade unions concluded the first collective employment agreement, or GAV, for the Swiss MEM industries. Since then, this agreement has formed the core element of the social partnership and is renegotiated once every five years. The current GAV has been in force since 2018. The contractual partners on the employees’ side are Employees Switzerland, Kaufmännischer Verband Schweiz, SKO, SYNA and Unia.
