= Calvin Adam Buehler =

American chemist (1896–1988)

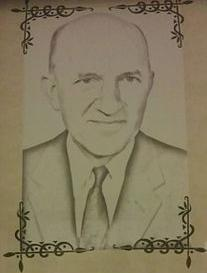
- Born: November 29, 1896; Stone Creek, Ohio, U.S.
- Died: February 29, 1988 (aged 91); Knoxville, Tennessee, U.S.
- Resting place: Highland Memorial Cemetery
- Occupation: Organic chemist

Calvin Adam Buehler (November 29, 1896 – February 29, 1988) was an American organic chemist and professor at the University of Tennessee from 1922 to 1965. He served as the Chemistry Department Head from 1940–1962, during which time he established the first chemistry doctoral program at the University of Tennessee. The chemistry building at the University of Tennessee is named Buehler Hall in his honor.

== Personal life ==
Calvin Buehler was born on November 29, 1896, in Stone Creek, Ohio. He was the second son of Philip E. Buehler and Mary Froelich, and was the middle child between his older brother, Hugo Buehler, and younger sister, Wilma Buehler. He began his education at the public elementary school in Stone Creek, Ohio and completed his secondary education at the high school in Dover, Ohio. In 1937, Calvin Buehler married Grace Stone Buehler. Following her death, he married Katherine Boies McCallen. Calvin Buehler died on February 29, 1988, in Knoxville, Tennessee. He is buried at Highland Memorial Cemetery.

== Academic career ==
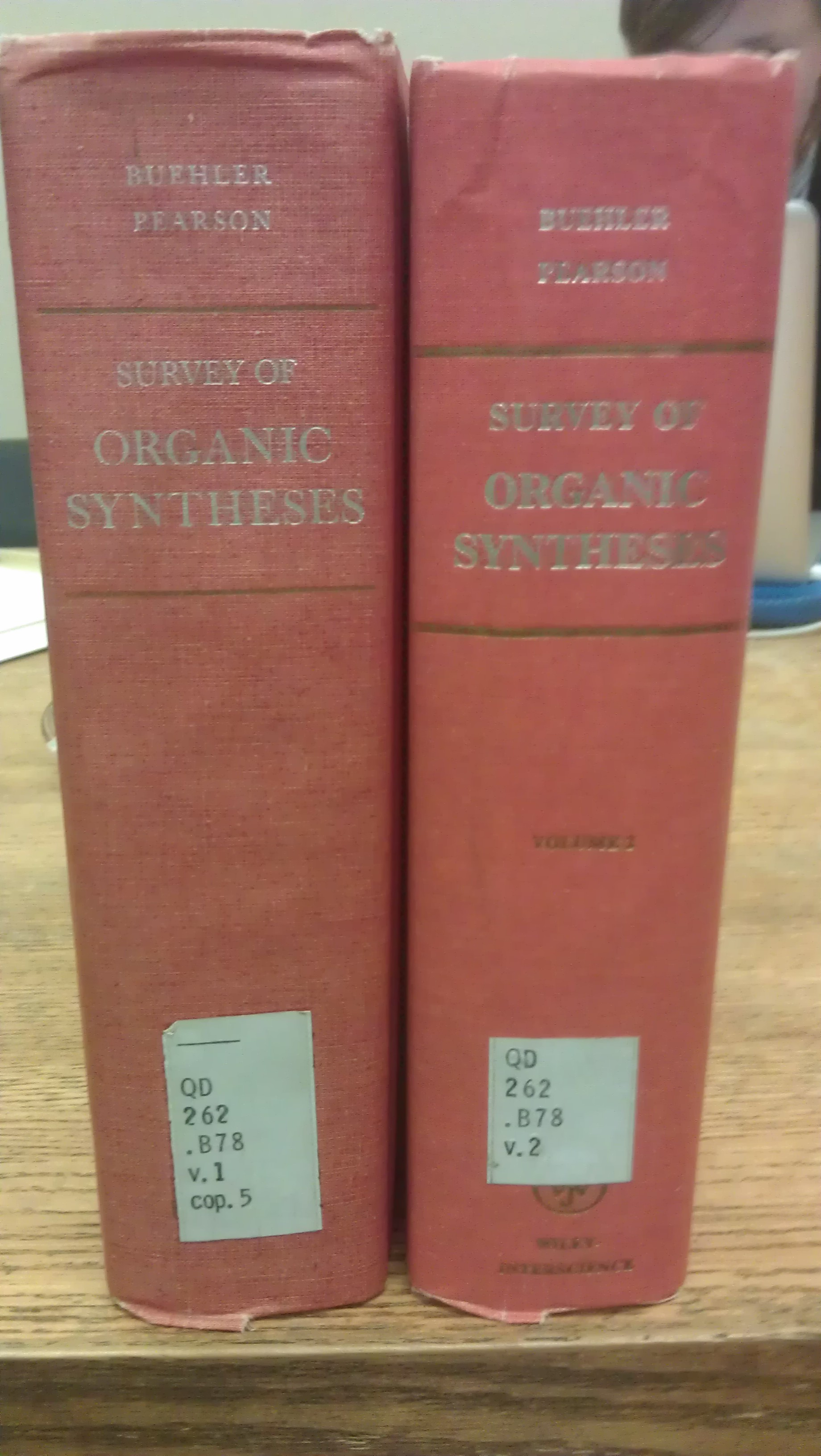
Survey of Organic Syntheses Vol. I and II written by Calvin A. Buehler

Buehler began his chemistry career as an undergraduate at Ohio State University where he obtained the degree of Bachelor of Chemical Engineering in 1918. Following matriculation, he was employed by The Barrett Company in Philadelphia, Pennsylvania as a research chemist. Shortly after, he returned to Ohio State University where he obtained a master's degree in 1920. He was awarded the DuPont Fellowship the following year and received his Ph.D. from Ohio State University in 1922. Later that year, Buehler joined the Chemistry Department at The University of Tennessee as an organic chemist. He would go on to become a distinguished educator and researcher in the chemistry department. Buehler was appointed as the Chemistry Department Head in 1940 and created the first chemistry doctoral program at the university. Calvin Buehler relinquished the job of department head in 1962 and retired from the University of Tennessee in 1965.

== Publications ==
In completing his Ph.D. in the Graduate School of Ohio State University, Calvin Buehler published his dissertation in 1922 titled The Oxidation of Lactose, Glucose, and Galactose by Means of Neutral and Alkaline Potassium Permanganate. His research was conducted under Dr. W. L. Evans and worked alongside C.W. Kreger. Over the span of his career, Buehler would publish over forty-two scholarly articles.

Buehler was the co-author of the book Survey of Organic Syntheses, published by Wiley-Interscience publications in 1970. The book was written with co-author Donald E. Pearson, an organic chemist from Vanderbilt University. The main focus of the text is the synthesis of particular classes of hydrocarbons or functional groups from other functional groups. In 1977, Buehler and Pearson published a second volume of Survey of Organic Syntheses. The second volume expands the contents of the first, adding new methods of syntheses not previously mentioned in the first volume.

== Honors and awards ==
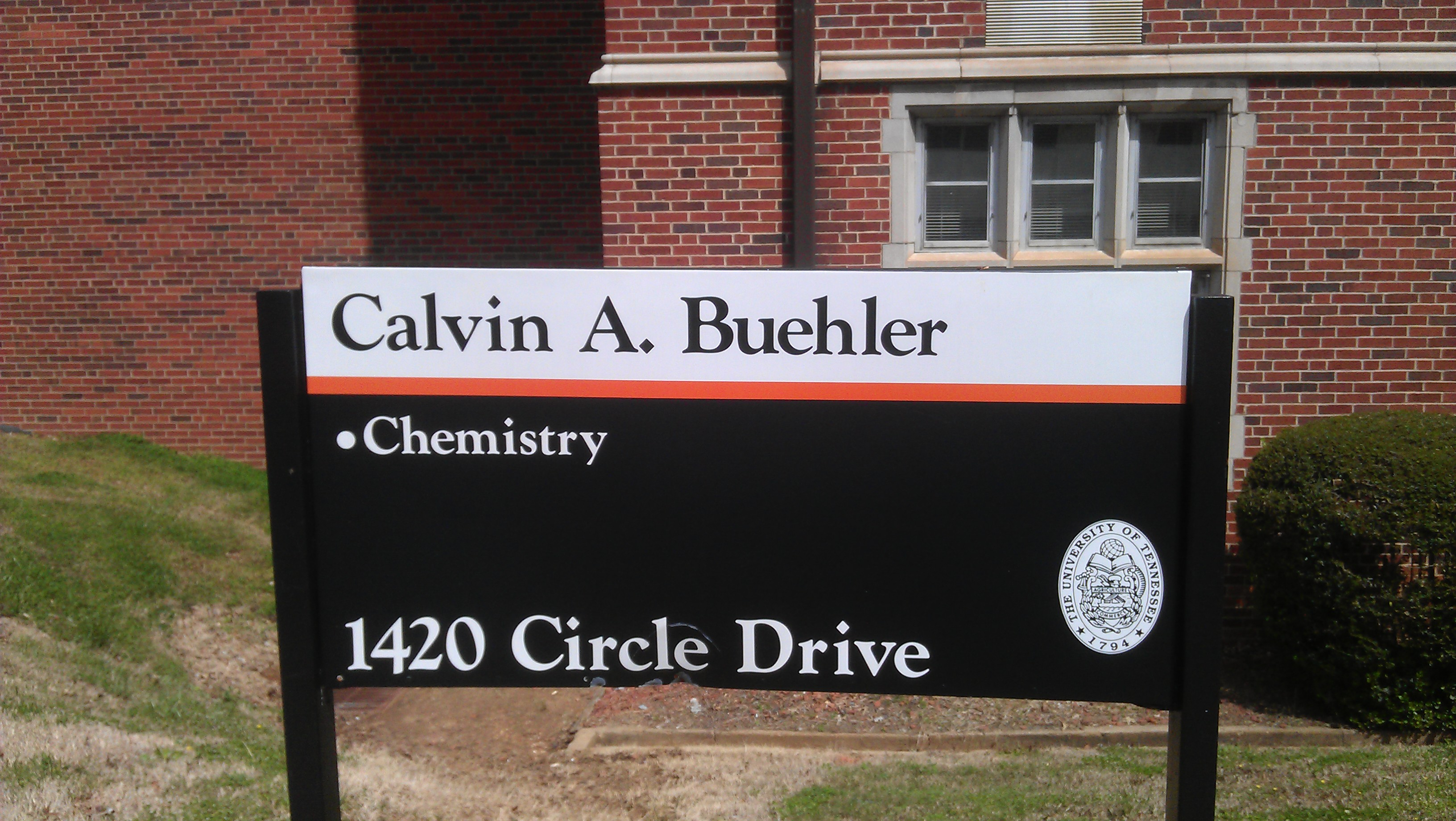
Buehler Hall: The building named after Calvin A. Buehler

Calvin Buehler was publicly recognized on several occasions both for his research and his teaching. He was the first recipient of the Southern Chemist Award in 1950. The award was given for his accomplishments in the field of Chemistry Research and Education, and was presented by the American Chemical Society for outstanding work in the Southern region. In 1963, Buehler was named one of the first five professors recognized as Distinguished Service Professors at the University of Tennessee. After his retirement in 1965, the University of Tennessee named their newly constructed chemistry building Buehler Hall in honor of his contributions to the University. The building still serves as the home of the chemistry department and chemistry research facilities at the university. In addition, the Calvin Buehler Chemistry Endowment was named in his honor, and the university also offers a Calvin Buehler Chemistry Scholarship, awarded to undergraduate students planning a career in chemistry.
