= Serge Gnabry =

German footballer (born 1995)

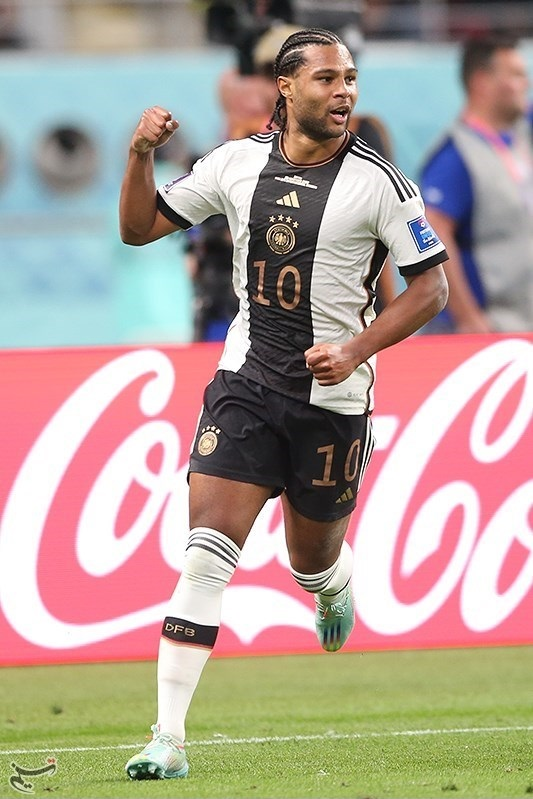
- Gnabry playing for Germany at the 2022 FIFA World Cup

Personal information
- Full name: Serge David Gnabry
- Date of birth: 14 July 1995 (age 31)
- Place of birth: Stuttgart, Germany
- Height: 1.76 m (5 ft 9 in)
- Positions: Forward; winger; attacking midfielder

Team information
- Current team: Bayern Munich
- Number: 7

Youth career
- 1999–2000: TSV Weissach
- 2000–2001: TSF Ditzingen
- 2001–2003: GSV Hemmingen
- 2003–2005: SpVgg Feuerbach
- 2005–2006: Stuttgarter Kickers
- 2006–2011: VfB Stuttgart
- 2011–2012: Arsenal

Senior career*
Years	Team	Apps	(Gls)
2012–2016	Arsenal	10	(1)
2015–2016	→ West Bromwich Albion (loan)	1	(0)
2016–2017	Werder Bremen	27	(11)
2017–	Bayern Munich	219	(79)
2017–2018	→ TSG Hoffenheim II (loan)	1	(0)
2017–2018	→ TSG Hoffenheim (loan)	22	(10)

International career^{‡}
2010–2011	Germany U16	5	(1)
2011–2012	Germany U17	12	(3)
2013	Germany U18	2	(3)
2013	Germany U19	5	(3)
2015–2017	Germany U21	16	(4)
2016	Germany Olympic	6	(6)
2016–	Germany	62	(26)
Medal record
Men's football
Representing Germany
Summer Olympics
Silver medal – second place	2016	Team
UEFA European Under-21 Championship
Winner	2017	Team
- * Club domestic league appearances and goals as of 19:29, 31 October 2026 (UTC) ‡ National team caps and goals as of 21:05, 1 October 2026 (UTC)

Serge David Gnabry (German pronunciation: [sɛʁʃ ˈdaːvɪt gnabʁi]; born 14 July 1995) is a German professional footballer who plays for Bundesliga club Bayern Munich and the Germany national team. A versatile player, he can be deployed as a forward, winger, or attacking midfielder.

Gnabry started his career in England with Arsenal in the Premier League, making his professional debut with the club in September 2012. He also had a brief spell on loan with West Bromwich Albion before moving back to Germany to join Werder Bremen in 2016. In 2017, he signed for Bayern Munich before being loaned to 1899 Hoffenheim for the 2017–18 season. In 2018–19, his first season with Bayern Munich, he won the Bundesliga title and was named their Player of the Season. The following season, Gnabry scored 23 goals as Bayern sealed a continental treble consisting of the Bundesliga, DFB-Pokal and UEFA Champions League.

After appearing for Germany at various youth levels, Gnabry made his senior international debut in November 2016 in a 2018 FIFA World Cup qualification match against San Marino, scoring a hat-trick in an 8–0 win. He represented Germany at UEFA Euro 2020 and the 2022 FIFA World Cup.

== Early life ==
Gnabry was born in Stuttgart, Baden-Württemberg to an Ivorian father and a German mother. In his youth, Gnabry was a talented sprinter but ultimately chose football over athletics.

== Club career ==
=== Arsenal ===
==== Early career ====
Gnabry's former club VfB Stuttgart agreed to a £100,000 deal with Premier League club Arsenal in 2010, but he had to wait until 2011, when he was 16, to join. Gnabry officially joined Arsenal for the 2011–12 season. He played for the under-18s for the majority of the season but was then promoted to the reserves after impressive displays. By the end of the season, Gnabry had played six games, scoring two goals.

==== 2012–15: Development and limited playing time ====
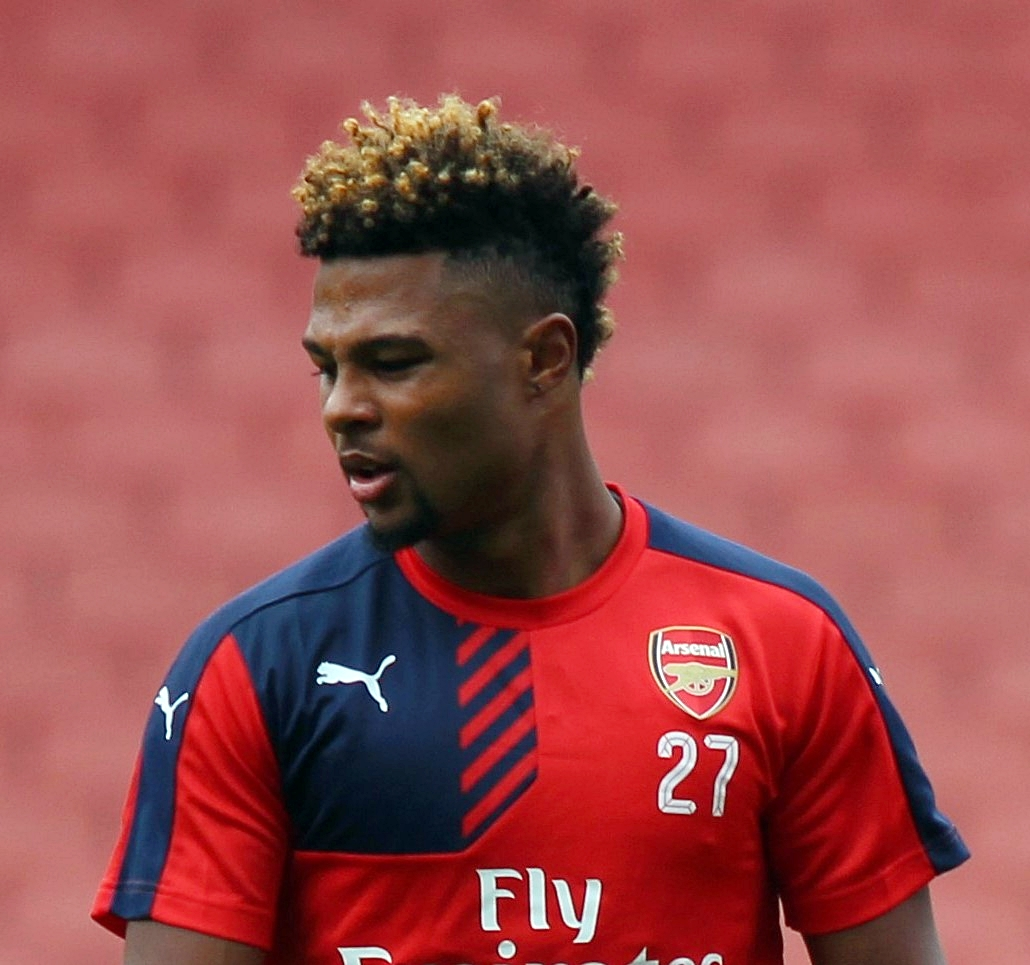
Gnabry with Arsenal in 2015

The 2012–13 season started off well for Gnabry after he was called up to the Arsenal first team for a pre-season friendly against FC Köln. He played 24 minutes after coming on at half-time and was replaced by Marouane Chamakh in the 69th minute. He then made his professional first-team debut for Arsenal on 26 September 2012 against Coventry City in the League Cup as a 72nd-minute substitute for Alex Oxlade-Chamberlain as Arsenal routed Coventry 6–1. On 20 October 2012, he made his Premier League debut in the 1–0 defeat against Norwich City at Carrow Road. At 17 years and 98 days, he became Arsenal's second-youngest player in the league's history after Jack Wilshere. Four days later, he made his UEFA Champions League debut, coming on as a substitute in Arsenal's 2–0 home loss to Schalke 04.

In the first game of the 2013–14 season, Gnabry was included in Arsenal's first-team squad against Aston Villa and started the game on the bench. He then made his first start for the club on 22 September 2013 in the Premier League against Stoke City after Theo Walcott was ruled out just before kick-off. He played 73 minutes before being subbed out for Ryo Miyaichi as Arsenal won the match 3–1. He scored his first professional goal in the next league match against Swansea City to lead Arsenal to a 2–1 victory and leave them top of the Premier League table. On 26 October, he won a penalty away at Crystal Palace in an eventual 2–0 victory for Arsenal. Gnabry's impressive start to the season resulted in a nomination for the 2013 Golden Boy Award, and a new five-year contract with Arsenal.

Gnabry went on to make 14 appearances in the 2013–14 season, including impressive performances in the FA Cup against Tottenham Hotspur and Coventry, with Gnabry helping Arsenal go on to win the tournament that year, featuring on the bench in the next two games against Liverpool and Everton.

Following his breakout season, Gnabry missed most of the 2014–15 season due to a serious knee injury which kept him away from the first team for over a year.

==== Loan to West Bromwich Albion ====
On 7 August 2015, Gnabry joined West Bromwich Albion on a season-long loan to gain first-team experience. He made his debut as a substitute in a 3–2 defeat to Chelsea on 23 August 2015. However, he did not make any further league appearances, with manager Tony Pulis stating in October that Gnabry was "not at the required level" to play for West Brom. In January, he was recalled from his loan after lacking first-team action at West Brom. He finished the 2015–16 season with one Premier League appearance and two League Cup appearances.

=== Werder Bremen ===
On 31 August 2016, Gnabry signed for Bundesliga club Werder Bremen for a reported transfer fee of £5 million. Arsenal manager Arsène Wenger had wanted to extend Gnabry's contract at Arsenal before his move, but a lack of first-team opportunities meant that the midfielder sought a move elsewhere.

He scored his first goal for Werder Bremen on 17 September 2016 in a 4–1 away loss to Borussia Mönchengladbach.

In his single season at the club, he made 27 league appearances scoring 11 goals while Werder Bremen finished 8th in the Bundesliga.

=== Bayern Munich ===
==== Loan to TSG Hoffenheim ====
On 11 June 2017, Bayern Munich announced the signing of Gnabry on a three-year contract for €8 million after activating a clause in his contract with Werder Bremen. On 14 July 2017, he joined TSG Hoffenheim on a season-long loan, having requested the move to gain more experience. He scored his first two league goals in the 4–0 victory over RB Leipzig. He scored 10 goals in his 22 appearances in the season helping Hoffenheim finish third in the league and secure a Champions League place for the next season. He finished the 2017–18 season with 10 goals in 26 appearances. He also made an appearance in the Regionalliga Südwest for the reserve team.

==== 2018–2020: Breakthrough and silverware ====
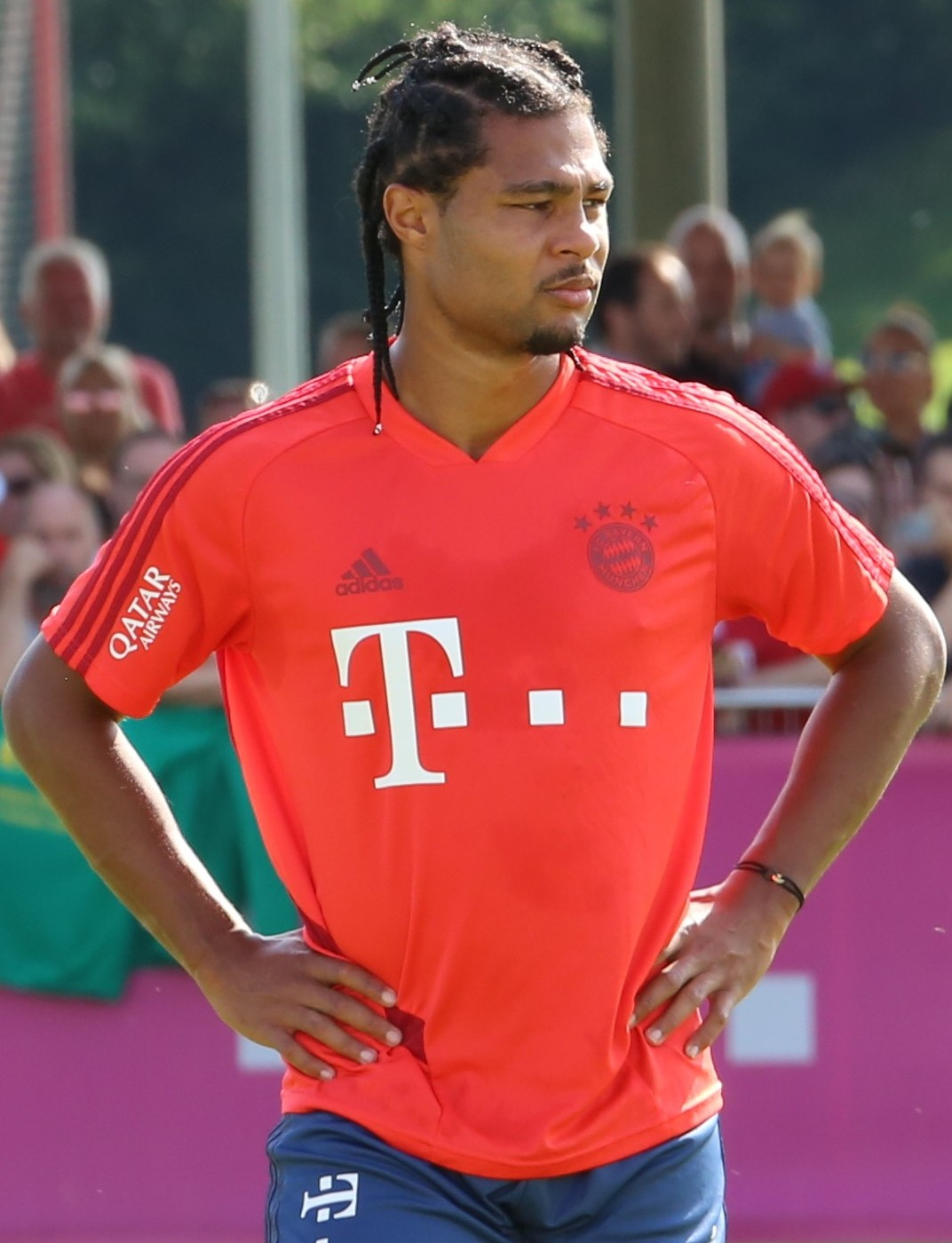
Gnabry training with Bayern Munich in 2019

On 2 July 2018, Gnabry was presented as a Bayern Munich player. Gnabry was assigned the jersey number 22. On 1 September, Gnabry made his Bundesliga debut for Bayern Munich in a 3–0 win at Stuttgart when he came on as a substitute in the 77th minute. On 3 November 2018, Gnabry scored his first Bundesliga goal for Bayern Munich in a 1–1 draw against Freiburg. On 1 December 2018, Gnabry scored two goals in a 2–1 win against his former club Werder Bremen. On 2 March 2019, Gnabry scored Bayern Munich's 4000th Bundesliga goal during a 5–1 win over Gladbach, helping the club become the first team to achieve the milestone. On 5 March 2019, he signed a new contract with Bayern Munich until June 2023, and finished the Bundesliga season as Bayern's second top scorer with 10 goals in 30 matches. He won his first Bundesliga title as Bayern finished two points above Borussia Dortmund with 78 points.

On 1 October 2019, Gnabry scored four goals in the 2019–20 UEFA Champions League 7–2 away win against Tottenham Hotspur. On 25 February 2020, he scored a brace against Chelsea in the first leg of the Champions League round of 16 in a 3–0 away win. This made him the first player to score six away goals in London in a single edition of the Champions League. On 14 August, he scored one goal in an 8–2 win against Barcelona in the quarter-finals. On 19 August, he scored a brace in a 3–0 win over Lyon in the semi-finals; taking his tally to nine goals in nine appearances in the competition that season. Bayern won 1–0 over Paris Saint-Germain in the final, to be his first Champions League title along with his teammate Joshua Kimmich, another VfB Stuttgart academy product.

==== 2020–2026: Bundesliga titles and contract extensions ====
Gnabry started the 2020–21 season by acquiring the No. 7 shirt, after Franck Ribéry who had worn it for eleven years. In the first match of the season, Gnabry scored a hat-trick in an 8–0 win over Schalke. This was his first Bundesliga hat-trick.

In July 2022, he signed a new contract with Bayern Munich until June 2026. On 26 October 2022, he provided a hat-trick of assists in a 3–0 away win over Barcelona to secure first place in Group C in the 2022–23 Champions League season. On 6 May 2023, he scored a goal in a 2–1 away win over his former club Werder Bremen; hence, he managed to score at least 10 Bundesliga goals in the last seven seasons. He finished the 2022–23 season as Bayern's top scorer in Bundesliga with 14 goals, and joint-top scorer in all competitions along with Eric Maxim Choupo-Moting, by netting 17 goals in total.

On 8 May 2024, he sustained a hamstring injury during the 2023–24 Champions League semi-final match against Real Madrid, further adding to his season plagued by muscle injuries, which would force him to miss the upcoming Euro 2024. Gnabry scored his first goal of the 2024–25 Bundesliga season in Bayern Munich's 3–2 win over Wolfsburg on 25 August 2024.

Gnabry scored his 100th Bayern Munich goal on 17 January 2026 when he netted the equaliser in an eventual 5–1 rout of RB Leipzig. On 5 February, he extended his contract with the club until 2028. In April that year, as Bayern secured the Bundesliga championship, Gnabry sustained an adductor muscle tear in his right leg during a training session which would sideline him for the remainder of the season — including the semi-final matches in the 2025–26 Champions League and 2025–26 DFB-Pokal — and the subsequent 2026 FIFA World Cup.

== International career ==
=== Youth teams and 2016 Summer Olympics ===
Gnabry represented Germany at various youth levels, including under-16, under-17 and under-18 levels. In 2017, he was part of the U21 team which won the European Under-21 Championship.

On 15 July 2016, Gnabry was selected for the Germany squad at the 2016 Summer Olympics. On 4 August, he started for Germany against Mexico and scored Germany's first goal after 58 minutes in a 2–2 draw with Mexico. Three days later, he tripled his tally by putting two past South Korea, the second being a stoppage time free kick that helped Germany salvage a point in a 3–3 draw. On 10 August, Gnabry contributed two more goals in a 10–0 defeat of Fiji. In Germany's quarter-final match against Portugal, he scored his sixth goal of the tournament just before half-time as Germany prevailed with a 4–0 win. He ended the tournament as the joint top scorer along with his teammate Nils Petersen, helping Germany to win the silver medal.

=== Senior team ===
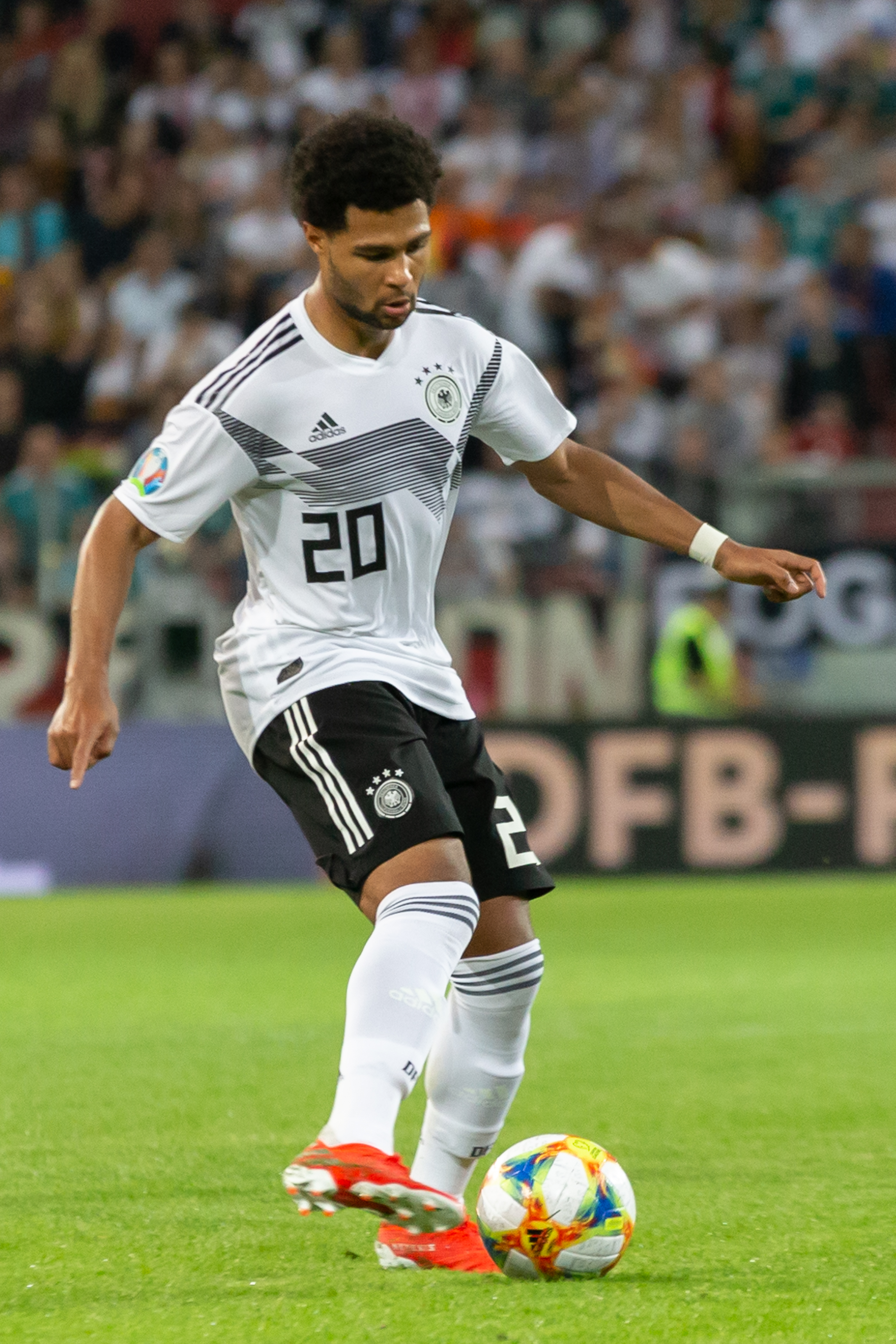
Gnabry playing for Germany in 2019

On 4 November 2016, Gnabry received his first call-up to the German senior team. Seven days later, he scored three goals on his debut in a 2018 World Cup qualifier against San Marino in an 8–0 away win. On 9 October 2019, during a 2–2 friendly international draw with Argentina, Gnabry became the fastest player to reach 10 goals for the nation, doing so in his 11th appearance and beating Miroslav Klose's record by 2 games. On 19 November 2019, he scored three goals in the 6–1 victory against Northern Ireland. It was his second hat-trick in his international career.

On 19 May 2021, he was selected to the squad for the UEFA Euro 2020. In November 2022, he was named in the 26-man squad for the 2022 FIFA World Cup in Qatar. Gnabry missed the UEFA Euro 2024, hosted in his home country, due to a torn muscle. Due to injury he was not considered for the squad for the 2026 FIFA World Cup.

== Style of play and fitness ==
Gnabry, who could not join Bayern's academy since it was a two-hour drive from his home in Stuttgart, joined Arsenal in 2011 at the age of 16. He later battled for fitness and first-team minutes, so he was loaned out to West Bromwich, where manager Tony Pulis mentioned that he was not ready for top-flight football, and was not good enough to play at the Hawthorns. Pulis later commented on him after his good performances with Bayern: "I'm amazed. We had him at West Brom, we took him on loan and we could never get him fit. He even got taken off in an Under-21 game and he went back to Arsenal and they sold him on ... To have him at West Brom and seeing him do what he's done is absolutely amazing."

His Arsenal manager Arsène Wenger said in 2020 that "he's creative, he can score goals, right-footed, left-footed, good power, good penetration, very, very clever with the timing of his runs... I knew he would have a great career. He can be a number nine, a number 10... he's a very intelligent player." His coach at Werder Bremen, Alexander Nouri, said: "He is lightning quick, a clinical finisher, but he puts a lot of work now into his defence... now he's making these deep runs back to his own box defending. He's capable of doing this work while on the other hand making deep runs in attack".

=== Goal celebrations ===
Gnabry's trademark "cooking" celebration was inspired by NBA star James Harden; Gnabry explained it by saying: "There's a video on YouTube where he's cooking after dropping, I think, a buzzer-beater and won the game. So he was cooking, stirring it up, and that's the celebration."

== Career statistics ==
=== Club ===
As of match played 31 October 2026

Appearances and goals by club, season and competition
Club	Season	League			National cup (Note: Includes FA Cup, DFB-Pokal)		League cup (Note: Includes Football League Cup)		Europe		Other		Total	
Club	Season	Division	Apps	Goals	Apps	Goals	Apps	Goals	Apps	Goals	Apps	Goals	Apps	Goals
Arsenal	2012–13	Premier League	1	0	0	0	2	0	1 (Note: Appearance(s) in UEFA Champions League)	0	—		4	0
Arsenal	2013–14	Premier League	9	1	2	0	1	0	2	0	—		14	1
Arsenal	2014–15	Premier League	0	0	0	0	0	0	0	0	0	0	0	0
Arsenal	Total		10	1	2	0	3	0	3	0	0	0	18	1
West Bromwich Albion (loan)	2015–16	Premier League	1	0	0	0	2	0	—		—		3	0
Werder Bremen	2016–17	Bundesliga	27	11	—		—		—		—		27	11
Bayern Munich	2018–19	Bundesliga	30	10	5	3	—		7	0	0	0	42	13
Bayern Munich	2019–20	Bundesliga	31	12	5	2	—		10	9	0	0	46	23
Bayern Munich	2020–21	Bundesliga	27	10	1	1	—		6	0	4 (Note: One appearance in UEFA Super Cup, one appearance in DFL-Supercup, two appearances in FIFA Club World Cup)	0	38	11
Bayern Munich	2021–22	Bundesliga	34	14	2	0	—		8	3	1 (Note: Appearance in DFL-/Franz Beckenbauer Supercup)	0	45	17
Bayern Munich	2022–23	Bundesliga	34	14	4	0	—		8	2	1	1	47	17
Bayern Munich	2023–24	Bundesliga	10	3	2	0	—		8	2	1	0	21	5
Bayern Munich	2024–25	Bundesliga	27	7	3	0	—		12	0	5 (Note: Appearances in FIFA Club World Cup)	0	47	7
Bayern Munich	2025–26	Bundesliga	21	8	4	0	—		11	2	1	0	37	10
Bayern Munich	2026–27	Bundesliga	5	1	1	0	—		1	0	0	0	7	1
Bayern Munich	Total		219	79	27	6	—		69	18	13	1	327	104
TSG Hoffenheim (loan)	2017–18	Bundesliga	22	10	1	0	—		3 (Note: Two appearances in UEFA Champions League, one appearance in UEFA Europa League)	0	—		26	10
TSG Hoffenheim II (loan)	2017–18	Regionalliga Südwest	1	0	—		—		—		—		1	0
Career total			280	101	30	6	5	0	76	18	13	1	403	127

=== International ===
As of match played 1 October 2026

Appearances and goals by national team and year
National team	Year	Apps	Goals
Germany	2016	2	3
Germany	2017	0	0
Germany	2018	3	1
Germany	2019	8	9
Germany	2020	4	1
Germany	2021	14	6
Germany	2022	8	1
Germany	2023	6	1
Germany	2024	4	0
Germany	2025	8	3
Germany	2026	5	1
Total		62	26

As of match played 27 March 2026
Germany score listed first, score column indicates score after each Gnabry goal

List of international goals scored by Serge Gnabry
No.	Date	Venue	Cap	Opponent	Score	Result	Competition	Ref.
1	11 November 2016	San Marino Stadium, Serravalle, San Marino	1	San Marino	2–0	8–0	2018 FIFA World Cup qualification	
2	11 November 2016	San Marino Stadium, Serravalle, San Marino	1	San Marino	4–0	8–0	2018 FIFA World Cup qualification	
3	11 November 2016	San Marino Stadium, Serravalle, San Marino	1	San Marino	6–0	8–0	2018 FIFA World Cup qualification	
4	15 November 2018	Red Bull Arena, Leipzig, Germany	4	Russia	3–0	3–0	Friendly	
5	24 March 2019	Johan Cruyff Arena, Amsterdam, Netherlands	6	Netherlands	2–0	3–2	UEFA Euro 2020 qualifying	
6	11 June 2019	Opel Arena, Mainz, Germany	8	Estonia	2–0	8–0	UEFA Euro 2020 qualifying	
7	11 June 2019	Opel Arena, Mainz, Germany	8	Estonia	6–0	8–0	UEFA Euro 2020 qualifying	
8	6 September 2019	Volksparkstadion, Hamburg, Germany	9	Netherlands	1–0	2–4	UEFA Euro 2020 qualifying	
9	9 September 2019	Windsor Park, Belfast, Northern Ireland	10	Northern Ireland	2–0	2–0	UEFA Euro 2020 qualifying	
10	9 October 2019	Westfalenstadion, Dortmund, Germany	11	Argentina	1–0	2–2	Friendly	
11	19 November 2019	Waldstadion, Frankfurt, Germany	13	Northern Ireland	1–1	6–1	UEFA Euro 2020 qualifying	
12	19 November 2019	Waldstadion, Frankfurt, Germany	13	Northern Ireland	3–1	6–1	UEFA Euro 2020 qualifying	
13	19 November 2019	Waldstadion, Frankfurt, Germany	13	Northern Ireland	4–1	6–1	UEFA Euro 2020 qualifying	
14	13 October 2020	RheinEnergieStadion, Cologne, Germany	15	Switzerland	3–3	3–3	2020–21 UEFA Nations League A	
15	28 March 2021	Arena Națională, Bucharest, Romania	19	Romania	1–0	1–0	2022 FIFA World Cup qualification	
16	7 June 2021	Merkur Spiel-Arena, Düsseldorf, Germany	22	Latvia	5–0	7–1	Friendly	
17	5 September 2021	Mercedes-Benz Arena, Stuttgart, Germany	28	Armenia	1–0	6–0	2022 FIFA World Cup qualification	
18	5 September 2021	Mercedes-Benz Arena, Stuttgart, Germany	28	Armenia	2–0	6–0	2022 FIFA World Cup qualification	
19	8 September 2021	Laugardalsvöllur, Reykjavík, Iceland	29	Iceland	1–0	4–0	2022 FIFA World Cup qualification	
20	8 October 2021	Volksparkstadion, Hamburg, Germany	30	Romania	1–1	2–1	2022 FIFA World Cup qualification	
21	1 December 2022	Al Bayt Stadium, Al Khor, Qatar	39	Costa Rica	1–0	4–2	2022 FIFA World Cup	
22	28 March 2023	RheinEnergieStadion, Cologne, Germany	41	Belgium	2–3	2–3	Friendly	
23	7 September 2025	RheinEnergieStadion, Cologne, Germany	53	Northern Ireland	1–0	3–1	2026 FIFA World Cup qualification	
24	10 October 2025	Rhein-Neckar-Arena, Sinsheim, Germany	54	Luxembourg	3–0	4–0	2026 FIFA World Cup qualification	
25	17 November 2025	Red Bull Arena, Leipzig, Germany	57	Slovakia	2–0	6–0	2026 FIFA World Cup qualification	
26	27 March 2026	St. Jakob-Park, Basel, Switzerland	58	Switzerland	2–2	4–3	Friendly	

== Honours ==
Arsenal

- FA Cup: 2013–14

Bayern Munich

- Bundesliga: 2018–19, 2019–20, 2020–21, 2021–22, 2022–23, 2024–25, 2025–26
- DFB-Pokal: 2018–19, 2019–20, 2025–26
- DFL/Franz Beckenbauer Supercup: 2020, 2021, 2022, 2025
- UEFA Champions League: 2019–20
- UEFA Super Cup: 2020
- FIFA Club World Cup: 2020

Germany Olympic

- Summer Olympic Games silver medal: 2016

Germany U21

- UEFA European Under-21 Championship: 2017

Individual

- Olympic Games top scorer: 2016
- Bayern Munich Player of the Season: 2018–19
- Bundesliga Player of the Month: October 2019, November 2022
- Bundesliga Goal of the Month: April 2025
- Bundesliga Team of the Season: 2019–20
- UEFA Champions League Squad of the Season: 2019–20
