= Manfred Bühler =

Swiss lawyer and politician

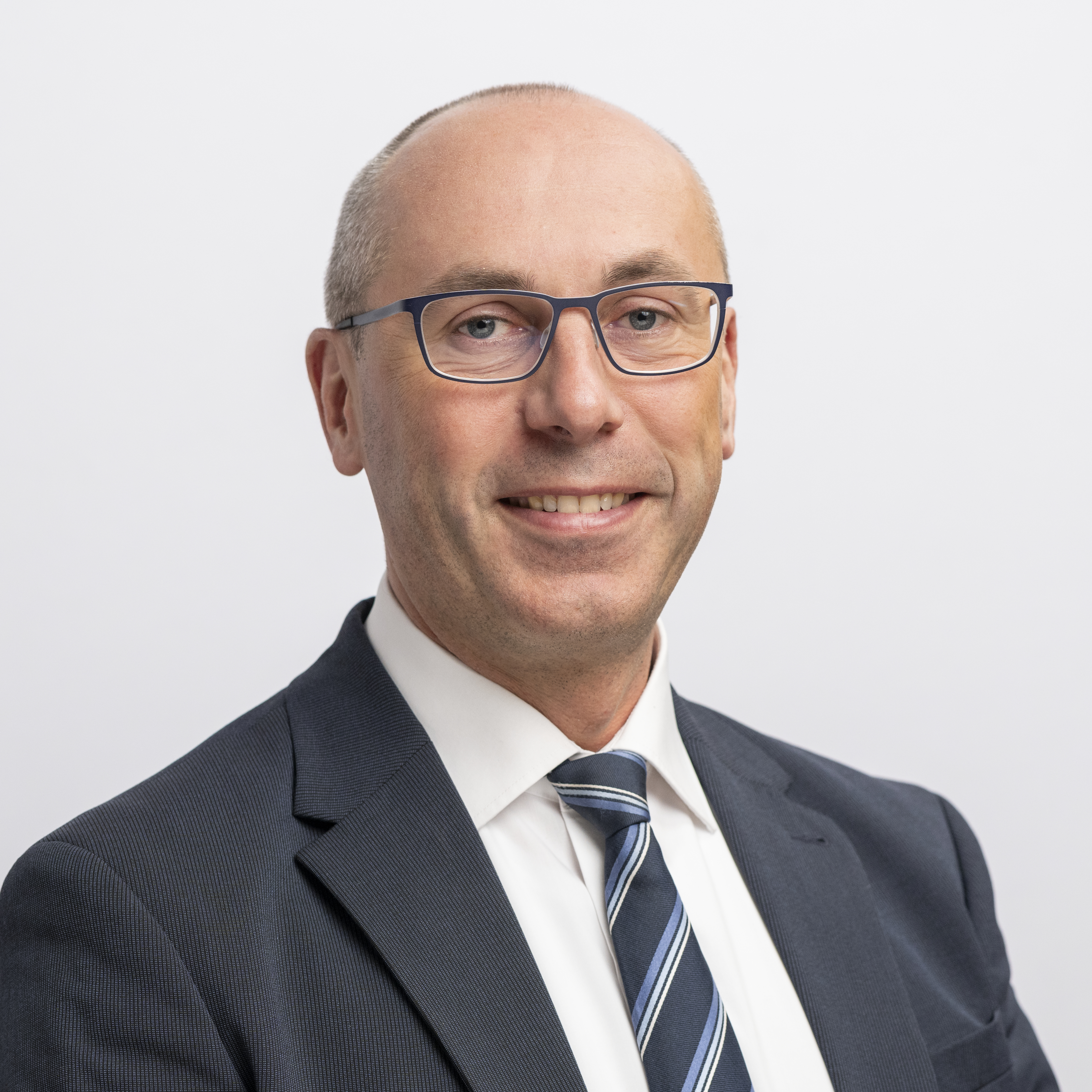
Manfred Bühler in 2023

Manfred Bühler (born April 10, 1979, with origin in Aeschi bei Spiez) is a Swiss lawyer and politician (Swiss People's Party).

== Life and career ==
Bühler comes from a farming family. He attended primary school in Cortébert and secondary school in Corgémont. Subsequently, he attended the French-speaking high school in Biel and passed his maturity examinations in 1998. He then pursued studies in law at the University of Bern, which he completed in 2003 with a licentiate. In 2007, he received his advocacy license and, in mid-2007, became a partner in a law firm in Biel.

== Political career ==
He joined the SVP in 1998 and, in the same year, became a member of the municipal council (executive) of Cortébert, where he has been serving as president of the municipality since 2015. In 2002, he became the secretary of the SVP of the Bernese Jura and, in 2004, a member of the cantonal party executive committee. In 2006, he was elected to the Bernese Jura Council and chaired the Commission for Justice, Municipalities, and Churches. Since 2010, he has been in the Grand Council of Bern. In the Swiss parliamentary elections of October 2015, Bühler was elected to the National Council but was not reconfirmed four years later.

Since 2012, he has been the Vice President of the SVP Canton of Bern, and in 2021, he was elected president, succeeding Werner Salzmann.
