= Donald E. Pearson =

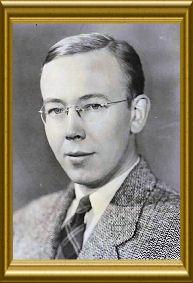
Donald E. Pearson

Donald Emanuel Pearson "Doc", (June 21, 1914 in Madison, Wisconsin – April 14, 2004 in Nashville, Tennessee) was an American chemist and scientific researcher. He was a professor of chemistry at Vanderbilt University from 1946 until his retirement as Distinguished Professor Emeritus in 1986.

In 1980, Vanderbilt University established the Donald E. Pearson Award in his honor. Most recently awarded in April 2011, it is presented to a graduating senior for distinguished undergraduate research in chemistry.

== Career ==
After graduating as salutatorian from Madison High School, Pearson enrolled at the University of Wisconsin–Madison where he played varsity baseball for 4 years and graduated in 1936 with a Bachelor's degree in Chemistry. He turned down an offer to pitch for the Chicago White Sox to pursue his doctoral studies at the University of Illinois at Urbana-Champaign where Carl Shipp Marvel ("Speed" Marvel) and Roger Adams were his mentors. Pearson became enamoured with research and teaching "hands on" bench chemistry.

After receiving his Ph.D., Pearson took a position as an industrial chemist with the Pittsburgh Plate Glass Co. and was recruited by the National Defense Research Committee (NDRC) Chemical Warfare Service (CWS) to evaluate chemical weapons (i.e. gases) in Bushnell, Florida during World War II. He intensely disliked using prisoners of war as test subjects and developed more humane modeling methodologies instead.

With the end of the WW II, he accepted a position at Vanderbilt University as an Assistant Professor of Chemistry and began research developing antimalarial drugs, commissioned by the U.S. Army. Pearson had the distinction of being able to totally support his research and salary throughout his career at Vanderbilt by obtaining grants. His first laboratory on campus was located in Furman Hall with windows which opened onto a baseball diamond, now known as Alumni Lawn, where graduation takes place each May, and often had students literally drop in..It was during this early point in his career (in 1956) that he published a seminal paper in the Journal of Organic Chemistry..."The Swamping Catalyst Effect in Bromination of Acetophenone" which, as the term he coined implies, describes the use of larger amounts of catalyst to "supercharge" chemical reactions which were subsequently driven to produce greater amounts of product. This literally opened up a new branch of chemistry research...Catalysis... and had enormous import at the time in the burgeoning field of biochemistry with enzyme mechanics (the so-called Vmax).

With very productive research efforts along with publications and award-winning teaching Dr. Pearson was promoted to full professor. At the midpoint of his career he took a sabbatical leave at the Max Planck Institute for Bioinorganic Chemistry in Mülheim an der Ruhr, Germany to do research on nuclear magnetic resonance (NMR). With his family in tow he traveled extensively in Europe, Africa and Israel during the politically tense period just before the first Middle East War (in ~1967) A second sabbatical in 1972-73 took him to the Richard Russell Research Center in Athens, Georgia. Here his research efforts were directed towards characterization of biologically active compounds derived from plant sterols. Pearson was the author of two seminal reference texts and over two hundred scientific papers. He patented the process of methanol conversion to gasoline using polyphosphoric acid (PPA) as a catalyst. With post doctoral colleague Sidhaghatta D. Venkataramu he developed a method of spin-label tagging of compounds so they can be traced in biologic systems as well as in industrial applications.

During the writing of Survey of Organic Syntheses, Pearson synthesized nearly one thousand novel compounds.

Pearson mentored hundreds of undergraduate and graduate students, many of whom went on to distinguished careers in industry, academia, government and medicine.

== Scientific papers ==
- D.E. Pearson; Adam Rosenberg (1975). "Potential antimalarials. 9. Resolution of alpha-diheptylaminomethyl-6-9-phenanthrenes-an unusual method". Journal of Medicinal Chemistry. 18 (5): 523–524. doi:10.1021/jm00239a018. PMID 1097687.
- D.E. Pearson; R.W. Brockman (1952). "The Effect of substituents on the Polargraphic Half-Wave Potentials of Benzophenones". Journal of the American Chemical Society. 74 (16): 4128–4129. doi:10.1021/ja01136a051.
- Donald E. Pearson; D. Cowan; J. D. Beckler (1959). "A Study of the Entrainment Method for Making Grignard Reagents". Journal of Organic Chemistry. 24 (4): 504–509. doi:10.1021/jo01086a015.
- Donald E. Pearson; Robert D. Wysong; Chas. V. Breder (1967). "Ortho bromination of phenols". Journal of Organic Chemistry. 32 (7): 2358–2360. doi:10.1021/jo01282a063.
- D. E. Pearson; H.W. Pope (March 1956). "The Swamping Catalyst Effect in Bromination of Acetophenone". Journal of Organic Chemistry. 21 (3): 381. doi:10.1021/jo01109a616.
