= Josua Mateinaniu =

Christian missionary in Fiji

Josua Mateinaniu was a preacher and catechist (teacher) in the Methodist Church of Fiji and Rotuma. A wanderer and a sailor at first, he drifted in his travels to Tonga, where he became a Christian.

== Life ==
In 1835, Mateinaniu helped William Cross and David Cargill in their linguistic preparations for the mission to Fiji. He became a preacher and came back to his own land with Cross and Cargill, and was himself a most important factor in the missionary impact made on Lakeba from the start. He went ahead of the first missionaries to Somosomo, and preached there with some success among the Tongans, who were in the service of Tui Cakau at that time, thus making it possible for Hunt and Lyth, to establish that station.

Of Mateinaniu, Cargill wrote the following in his wife, Margaret's memoirs:

Joshua Mateinaniu, the person mentioned in the preceding paragraph, is a Feejeean (Fijian), and is related to the principal family in Vulanga, an island to the south of Lakemba, and containing about one thousand inhabitants. He accompanied Vuki, a Tonga Chief, to the Tonga isles, in order to teach the Tonguese (Tongans) a Feejeean dance and song, called wesi. He never accomplished his design; and he has frequently expressed his gratitude that, instead of being permitted to teach the Tonguese a foolish and useless dance and song, the Missionaries were instrumental in teaching him to sing the songs of Zion. After his conversion he was employed as a local preacher, and accompanied Messrs. Cross and Cargill to Feejee, to aid them in publishing the glad tidings of salvation among his ignorant and perishing countrymen. He is a man of few words, and great meekness. He is a willing labourer, and is faithful and zealous in the discharge of his duty. He has been honoured by God as an instrument of good, as a subordinate agent of the Mission in Feejee. He was sent as a Missionary to the Tonguese who were sojourning with Tanoa at Thakaundrove.

He preached in Bau regularly, long before it was really opened to white missionaries. At the time of Hunt's death, he was stationed at Viwa; he and his wife personally cared for Hunt's family during the long weeks of that final illness.

One of the four houses at Lelean Memorial School, a Methodist church secondary school located at Davuilevu, Nausori, is named in honour of Mateinaniu.
