= Jozua Naudé =

Jozua Naudé may refer to:

- Jozua Naudé (politician), acting state president of South Africa 1967–68
- Jozua Naudé (pastor), South African pastor, school founder and co-founder of the Afrikaner Broederbond
