= Winfried Bühler =

German classical philologist

- Born: Winfried Gregor Anton Maria Bühler; 11 June 1929; Münster, Westphalia, Germany
- Died: 14 February 2010 (aged 80); Munich, Germany
- Education: University of Bonn; University of Tübingen; Ludwig-Maximilians-Universität München
- Occupations: Classical Philologist; University Teacher
- Spouse: Ria Fisser
- Parent(s): Ottmar Bühler (1884–1965); Maria Michels (1896–1990)

Winfried Bühler (11 June 1929 – 14 February 2010) was a German classical philologist.

== Life ==
Winfried Gregor Anton Maria Bühler was born in Münster. Ottmar Bühler (1884–1965), his father, was a distinguished Professor of Public Law - notably of Tax Law - at the University of Münster. Soon after Winfried was born his elder brother died, something which he very seldom mentioned but which nevertheless haunted him through his life. However, the timing of his birth meant that he narrowly avoided wartime conscription into the army or "Volkssturm" (militia). He attended the classics oriented "Beethoven Gymnasium" (secondary school) in Bonn, successfully completing his school leaving exams ("Abitur") at an unusually young age. He was still too young to be permitted to progress to a university immediately.

During the Summer Term 1947 he joined a student building gang working on the reconstruction of the destroyed buildings at Bonn University. This guaranteed him the chance to enroll for the Winter Term. Having done so, he began by studying Philosophy and classical Philology. Later he broadened his academic scope to include Romance studies. He was taught at Bonn by the philologists Wolfgang Schmid and Hans Herter. He then moved on to Tübingen University where he was taught by Walther Ludwig. The two became lifelong friends. Bühler's subsequent student career also took him to the University of Hamburg, the University of Lyon, and the Ludwig-Maximilians-Universität München. He was by all accounts a serious and committed student.

At the Ludwig-Maximilians-Universität München, Bühler was taught by Rudolf Pfeiffer, who had recently returned from a lengthy period of political exile at the University of Oxford. He had been obliged to leave Munich in 1937 because Lili Pfeiffer, his wife, had been classified as Jewish by the authorities, which put their lives in danger if they remained in Germany. During his time in Oxford Pfeiffer had further enhanced his already formidable academic reputation, notably with further published work on the Callimachus papyri. For Winfried Bühler to be accepted as a student by Pfeiffer is taken by contemporaries as an indication that he had already himself been marked out as a student of exceptional ability and potential.

In autumn 1954, Bühler passed his Level 1 teaching exam. On 1 March 1955, he was appointed to a position as an academic research assistant at the Ludwig-Maximilians-Universität München in classical Philology. His doctorate followed in 1957. His dissertation, supervised by Pfeiffer, was a scholarly and rigorously detailed exploration of the epyllion on Europa by Moschus. The dissertation was in due course published as a book. Unusually, however, this took a further three years because Bühler completely rewrote it, to take account of new research and discoveries and, based on these, new evaluations of the handwritten tradition and Hellenistic usages. He received his habilitation, again from the Ludwig-Maximilians-Universität München, in 1962. This was followed by a two-year research fellowship funded by the Deutsche Forschungsgemeinschaft ("German Research Association").

He remained in Munich until 1966. That year he accepted an associate professorship at the University of California, Los Angeles, where he met Paul Friedländer. He returned to Germany just one year later, responding to an invitation from the University of Hamburg where in 1968, he was appointed to a professorship of classical philologist. Distinguished predecessors at the University of Hamburg included Bruno Snell and Hartmut Erbse. Early on during his Hamburg years, in 1970, he rejected an attempt by the University of Bern to lure him away. Bühler remained at the University of Hamburg until his retirement in 1991. He taught only until 1989, however, which was when funding from the Stifterverband für die Deutsche Wissenschaft made it possible for him to progress without interruption his main project at that time, which was his work on the Proverbs of Zenobius.

After 1991, he retired and moved back to Munich.

== Works ==
Greek mythology and Paremiography lay at the heart of Bühler's research. He was respected, in particular, as a leading contributor to the Lexikon des frühgriechischen Epos ("Lexicon of early Greek Epic Poetry"). Since 1982, he has engaged in producing a critical compilation of the sayings of Zenobius, which now extends to three volumes.

== Memberships and honours ==
Bühler was a member of the Joachim Jungius Socierty of Arts and Humanities ("Joachim-Jungius-Gesellschaft der Wissenschaften") in Hamburg from 1972, serving as its president between 1982 and 1985. He was a full member of the Göttingen Academy of Sciences and Humanities from 1980, having been a corresponding member since 1974. In 1985, he became a corresponding member of the British Academy. He became a corresponding member of the Bavarian Academy of Sciences and Humanities in 1988. He also, in 2002, received an honorary doctorate from the University of Thessaloniki.

== Output (selection) ==
- Die Europa des Moschos. Text, Übersetzung und Kommentar. Wiesbaden 1960 (Hermes. Einzelschriften 13)
- Beiträge zur Erklärung der Schrift vom Erhabenen. Göttingen 1964
- Europa. Ein Überblick über die Zeugnisse des Mythos in der antiken Literatur und Kunst. München 1968
- Zur L-Überlieferung der Athosklasse der griechischen Parömiographen. Göttingen 1979, ISBN 978-3-525-85116-6
- Zenobii Athoi Proverbia vulgari ceteraque memoria aucta. 3 Bände (mehr nicht erschienen), Göttingen 1982–1999
  - Band 1 (1987): Prolegomena complexum, in quibus codices describuntur, ISBN 978-3-525-25746-3
  - Band 4 (1982): Libri secundi proverbia 1–40, ISBN 978-3-525-25742-5
  - Band 5 (1999): Libri secundi proverbia 41–108, ISBN 978-3-525-25749-4
- Zur handschriftlichen Überlieferung der Sprüche der sieben Weisen. Göttingen 1989
