= Ottmar Bühler =

Swiss-German jurist and law professor

- Born: 12 August 1884; Zürich, Switzerland
- Died: 27 May 1965 (aged 80); Munich, West Germany
- Education: University of Tübingen; Ludwig-Maximilians-Universität München; Friedrich Wilhelm University of Berlin
- Occupation: professor of Tax Law
- Spouse: Maria Michels Bühler (1896–1990)
- Children: Winfried Bühler (1929–2010)

Ottmar Bühler (12 August 1884 – 27 May 1965) was a German Law professor specialising in tax law.

== Life ==
Ottmar Bühler was born in Zurich. His father was a professor of Forestry at the University of Tübingen. Despite him being born in Switzerland, Bühler's father had been born in Württemberg, and it was in Tübingen that he grew up and attended school (Gymnasium). His subsequent period as a student of Jurisprudence was at the University of Tübingen, the Ludwig-Maximilians-Universität München (LMU Munich), and the Friedrich Wilhelm University of Berlin. He undertook his "Referendariat" (practical training) between 1908 and 1911, and then received his doctorate in 1911 for work on the nineteenth century evolution of civil law jurisdiction with regard to the administration of the law in Württemberg. Two years later, in 1913, he gained his habilitation (higher academic qualification) from the University of Breslau (as Wrocław was then known). His dissertation was entitled (applying a loose translation), "Subjective public law and its protection in the administrative jurisdiction" He also received his "public law" teaching certificate at this time.

War broke out towards the end of July 1914. Bühler ended up as a "first lieutenant". However, between 1914 and 1916 he worked in the civil administration for occupied Belgium. It was only in 1916 that he was called up for service in the army, after which he earned himself an Iron Cross (medal). War ended in 1918 to be followed by a succession of revolutionary uprisings across many parts of Germany. It was in the chaos of those times that Bühler was elected a lieutenant, although the rank was awarded only retrospectively, in 1922.

On 16 January 1920 Ottmar Bühler was appointed to an extraordinary professorship in public law at the University of Münster. He became a lecturer in administrative law and, more particularly, tax law, labour and industrial law and civil/public law. The focus of his own research was already on tax law. In 1922 he was appointed to a full professorship in public law at Halle. Nevertheless, by the end of 1923 he had already returned to the University of Münster where now he took on a full professorship in the same topic. His own pursuit of research in tax law forced the university to incorporate the subject on the public law syllabus and the scope of his own teaching in a way that was at that time innovative.

Bühler now developed tax law as an academic discipline in its own right within the university's Public Law faculty, naming the sub-department "Tax Law Seminar section" ("Seminar für Steuerrecht"). It was only in 1934 that this became the university "Tax Law Institute" - a first for Germany. In the years ahead he concentrated almost exclusively on the study of tax law, now also taking an increasing interest in tax law issues arising internationally. In 1937, he undertook a research visit to the United States of America and in 1938 he was a co-founder of the International Fiscal Association. In most respects, Bühler successfully avoided political involvement. However, during 1933 Germany became a one-party dictatorship and it is hard to see how he could have pursued his academic career effectively during the twelve Nazi years without being broadly supportive of the political establishment of the time. One source reports that he was a "sponsor" of the SS ("Förderndes Mitglied der SS"), which would have involved making financial contributions to the running of the paramilitary wing of the Nazi Party.

In 1942, he accepted an invitation to transfer to the University of Cologne where he was installed in Germany's first teaching chair dedicated to international finance and tax law. He was able to reinforce the status of tax law as an academic discipline in its own right. He taught at Cologne till 1952. The end of the war in May 1945 was accompanied by a collapse of the Hitler government, and what remained of Germany was divided into four military occupation zones. Cologne fell within the British zone. Bühler is identified as the first German university teacher who now committed to a "new beginning for academic work on tax law" (ein "neues Beginnen wissenschaftlicher Arbeit am Steuerrecht"), and in his Cologne University Institute for Tax Law he made a start on working through past instances of tax injustice. For him the task of bringing the tax regime back inline with legal principles was all the more urgent under allied military occupation because of the extent to which the Hitler régime had largely ignored such niceties ("beim Vollzug dieser Gesetze die rechtsstaatlichen Postulate, die der Hitlerstaat so weitgehend mißachtet hatte, wieder zur Geltung zu bringen"). In April 1947 he inaugurated the first postwar academic tax conference in Bonn, with the objective of reconfiguring German tax law. At the Bonn conference the three affected academic disciplines at Cologne agreed to work together to create a shared postwar teaching curriculum for taxation studies in order to educate financial officials, taxation advisors and lawyers on the necessary principles and details. This meant that Cologne, which for decades had been one of the country's largest universities, now became the national centre for academic research and teaching on tax law.

After the combined relaunch of the US, UK and French occupation zones as the German Federal Republic (West Germany) in May 1949, Otto Bühler was involved in taxation reform through his membership of the Academic Advisory Board at the new country's Finance Ministry.

Bühler retired from Cologne University in 1952, the year of his 68th birthday. He now took the opportunity to update comprehensively his two volume core work, "Steuerrecht" ("Tax Law") which filled a gaping hole in the postwar market for academic text books. By this time, in the wider academic community, his most important achievement was seen to have been the complete integration of "tax law" in the wider field of civil and constitutional law.

After his retirement in Cologne he moved to Munich where he was given a teaching contract and cemented his academic reputation and legacy. The LMU Munich still awards an annual Ottmar Bühler Prize for outstanding academic achievements in the field of business taxation teaching and research. He died in Munich on 27 May 1965, shortly after visiting London for a final research trip.

== Personal ==
Ottmar Bühler married Maria Michels Bühler (1896 - 1990). Winfried Bühler (1929 - 2010), their son, became a professor of classical philology.
