= Theodor Bühler-Lindenmeyer =

Swiss pharmacist and ornithologist (1859-1899)

Theodor Bühler-Lindenmeyer (18 August 1859 – 29 June 1899) was a Swiss pharmacist and ornithologist. He was an active member of the Basel Society for Natural History and was involved in cataloging the birds of Switzerland.

Bühler was born in St. Imier to Bank clerk Jules-Emil Bühler from Aschi, Canton of Bern, and Esther née Heussler from Basel. He grew up in Bern from 1862, and after school, he apprenticed in the pharmacy of Wildbolz, passing the assistants exam three years later. He studied French in Neuenburg and worked briefly at Metzingen, Kissingen, London, and Nice. He studied at Freiburg and Strassburg and passed the pharmaceutical examination in Berlin in 1885. He became an assistant at the Hagenbach pharmacy of Kümmerlen in Basel in 1885 and became its owner in 1886. In 1889, he married Maria Lindenmeyer, daughter of merchant Jakob Friedrich. He was a member of the Swiss Ornithological Society and presided over it in 1886. He worked on a catalog of the birds of Switzerland at the natural history museum in Basel. He also took part in geological excursions led by Professor Carl Schmidt and zoological excursions led by Professor Zschokke.

On June 27, 1899, he went on an excursion in the outskirts of the village of Blumberg around Donaueschingen and a childhood friend, Dr Kurz, when lightning struck them. Kurz recovered, but Bühler was killed.
