= Hedy Hahnloser-Bühler =

Swiss painter, craftswoman, art collector and art patron (1873 – 1952)

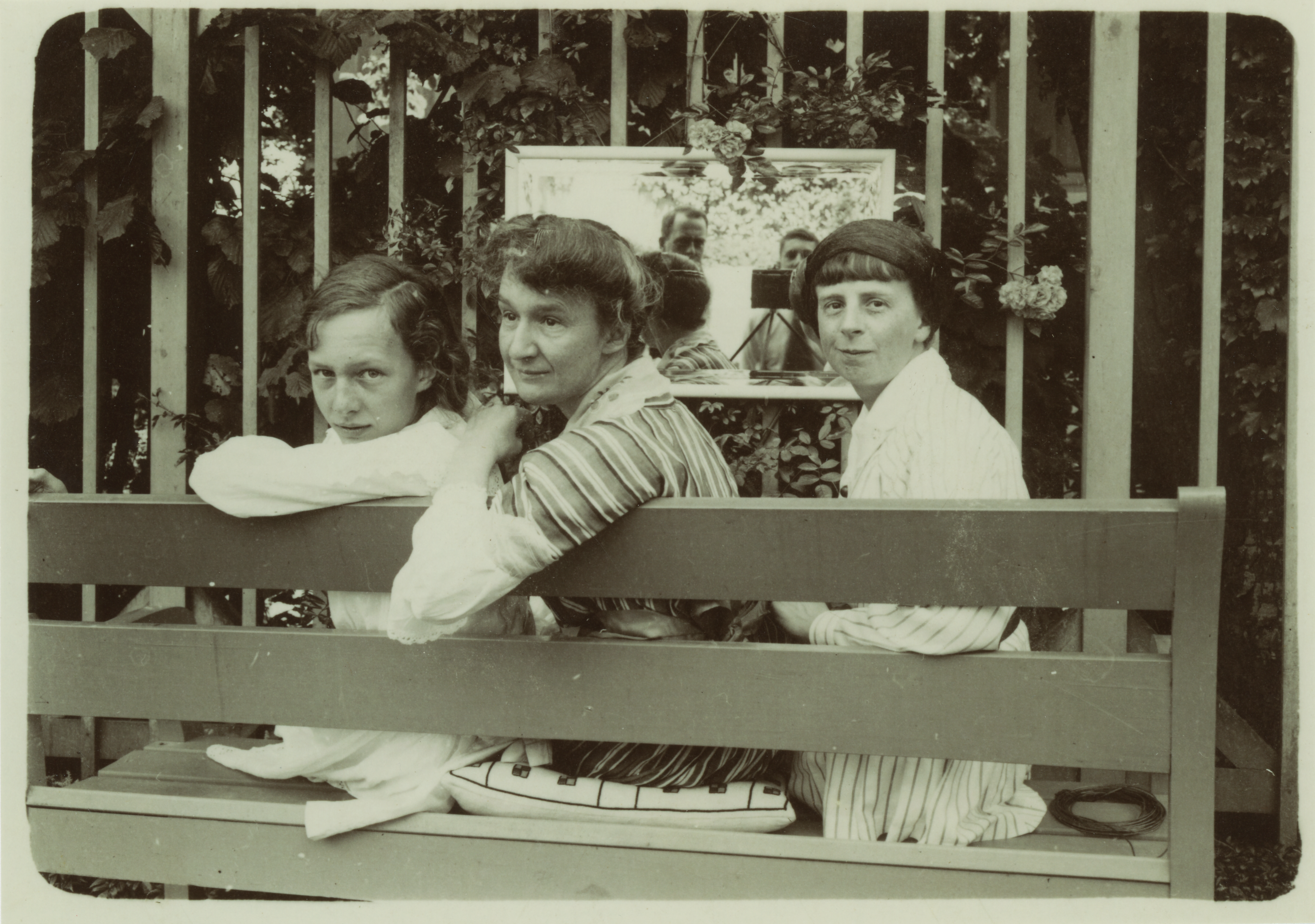
Hedy Hahnloser-Bühler with daughter Lisa and friend

Hedy Hahnloser-Bühler (5 February 1873 – 9 May 1952) was a Swiss painter, craftswoman, art collector and patron of the arts.

== Life ==
Hedwig (Hedy) was born 5 February 1873 in Winterthur was the second of four children of Carl and Ida Bühler-Blumer, a strict industrialist family in Winterthur which operated spinning mills. In 1889, Hedy entered the drawing school for industry and commerce in St. Gallen.

She married Arthur Hahnloser, an ophthalmologist, on 24 October 1898.

They moved into the "Villa Flora" in Winterthur, which was already in the family possession of the Bühlers and set up an eye clinic. Hedy Hahnloser-Bühler assisted her husband in running the practice. In 1899 and 1901, their son Hans and daughter Lisa were born.

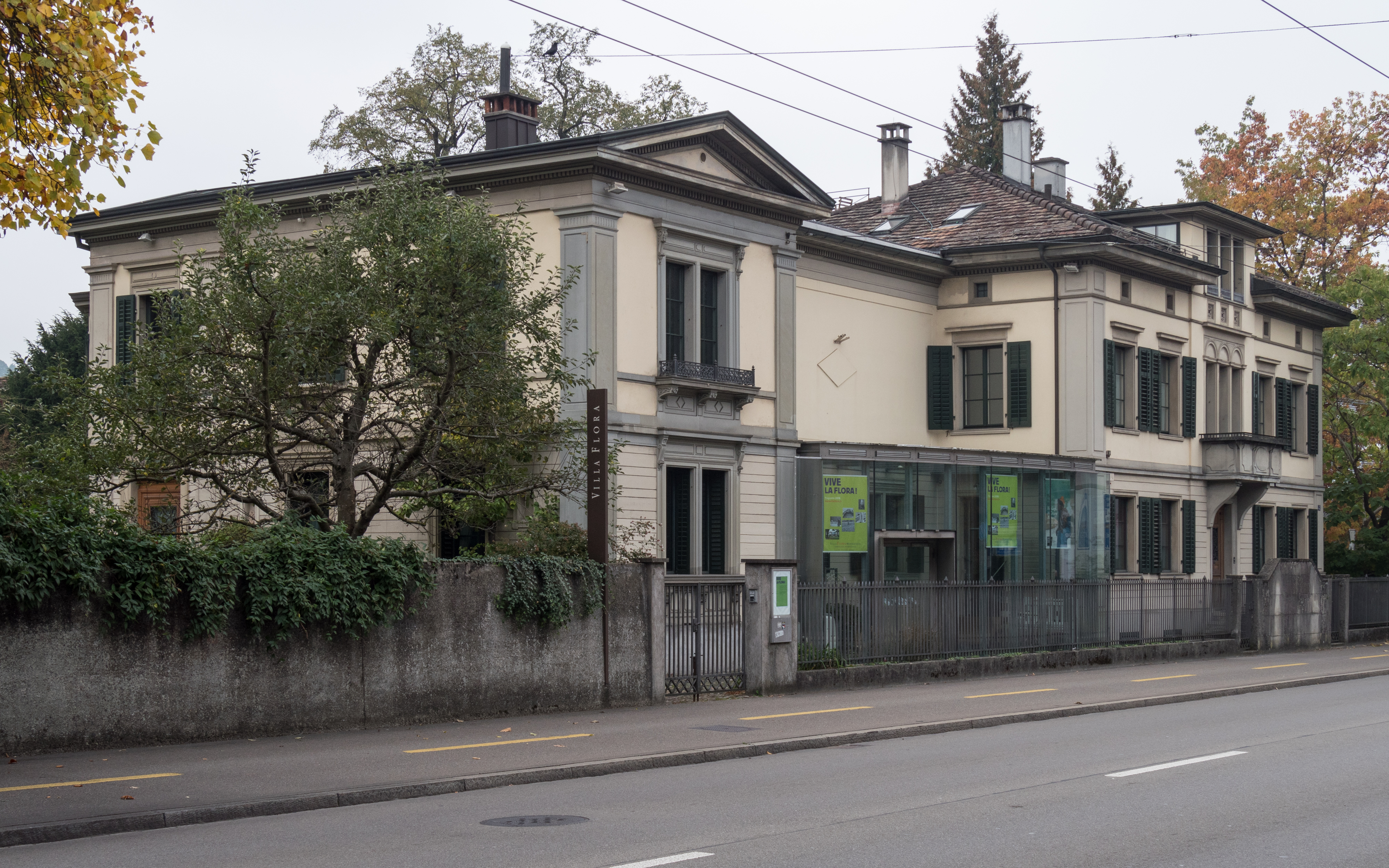
«Villa Flora» in Winterthur

She also worked as an artisan, and gathered people interested in monument preservation and architecture to exchange ideas. Attendees included Robert Rittmeyer (architect), Jules de Praetere (director of the Zurich School of Applied Arts), Richard Bühler (Hedy Hahnloser-Bühler's cousin) and others. They replaced the board members of the Kunstverein Winterthur with people from their circles at the general assembly of 1907.

The Hahnlosers collected art. In 1908 they traveled to Paris, where they befriended the painters Felix Vallotton, Odilon Redon, Pierre Bonnard and others. In Switzerland they collected works by Ferdinand Hodler, Giovanni Giacometti and many other artists.

In 1909, Hedy Hahnloser-Bühler was diagnosed with pulmonary tuberculosis.

After World War I, she purchased the "Villa Pauline" in Cannes. The climate had a positive effect on Hahnloser-Bühler's illness, and there was a thriving art scene. They expanded their art collection.

On 17 May 1936, Arthur Hahnloser died of a heart attack in Cannes.

Hedy Hahnloser-Bühler died 9 May 1952 in Winterthur at the age of 79.

The collection of paintings was made accessible to the public as a museum in the "Villa Flora" by her descendants and transferred to a foundation.

== Works ==
Hahnloser-Bühler had a great influence on the couple's collecting activities. As a patron of the arts, she commissioned several portrait paintings of herself and her children. Through self-study, she developed into a respected art expert and published many art reviews in magazines and newspapers. Paintings in their collection included works by Henri Matisse, Felix Valloton, Edouard Vuillard, Pierre Bonnard, Odilon Redon, Ferdinand Hodler and others.

== Writings (selection) ==
- Felix Vallotton. In: Das Graphische Kabinett, 2. Jg. Nr. 2, 1916
- Honoré Daumier in seiner Bedeutung für unsere Zeit. In: Das Graphische Kabinett, Jg. 3, Nr. 7, 1917.
- Vorbilder der schweizerischen Kunst. In: National-Zeitung (Basel), Nr. 364, 18. August 1919.
- Kunstpflege in der Schweiz. In: National-Zeitung (Basel), Sondernummer «Schweizer Kunst», Nr. 431, 26. September 1919.
- Odilon Redon als Graphiker. In: Das Graphische Kabinett, Jg. 4, Nr. 5/6, 1919.
- Eugène Delacroix. In: Das Graphische Kabinett, Jg. 6, Nr. 6, 1921.
- Felix Vallotton. In: Das Graphische Kabinett, Jg. 11, Nr. 2, 1926.
- Die Trachtenfrage im Knonaueramt. In: Das Werk : Architektur und Kunst = L'oeuvre : architecture et art, Bd. 13, 1926, H. 5, S. 265–267. Digitalisat
- Felix Vallotton 1865–1925, Bd. 1, Der Graphiker, Bd. 2, Der Maler. Neujahrsblatt. Verlag der Zürcher Kunstgesellschaft, Kunsthaus Zürich, 1927 und 1928.
- Um Felix Vallotton. Urteile von Künstlern und Kritikern über Felix Vallotton. In: Das Werk. Architektur, freie Kunst, angewandte Kunst, Jg. 8, Nr. 10, 1931.
- Felix Vallotton et ses amis. Sedrowski, Paris 1936. [Mit Œuvrekatalog]
- Felix Vallotton et ses amis. In: Galerie und Sammler (Zürich), Jg. 4, Nr. 8, 1936.
- Les Impressionnistes dans la collection Hahnloser. Vorwort zum Ausstellungskatalog La Peinture française du XIX e siècle en Suisse. In: Gazette des Beaux-Arts, Paris 1938.
- Pierre Bonnard. In: Hauptwerke des Kunstmuseums Winterthur. 1949.
- Erinnerungen an Bonnard. In: Neue Zürcher Zeitung, 11. Juni 1949.

== Honors ==
In 2006, a street, Hedy Hahnloser-Strasse, was named after her in Winterthur.

== Literature ==
- Bettina Hahnloser: Revolution beim schwarzen Kaffee. Verlag Neue Zürcher Zeitung, Zürich 2008, ISBN 978-3-03823-414-2.
- Margrit Hahnloser-Ingold (Hg.): Die Sammlung Arthur und Hedy Hahnloser. Benteli Verlag, Bern 2011, ISBN 978-3-7165-1681-2.
