= Hans Adolf Bühler =

German painter (1877–1951)

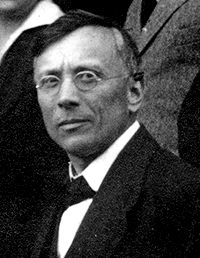
Hans Adolf Bühler (1923)

Hans Adolf Bühler (4 June 1877, Steinen – 19 October 1951, near Sasbach am Kaiserstuhl) was a German painter and National Socialist Kulturpolitiker.

== Life and work ==
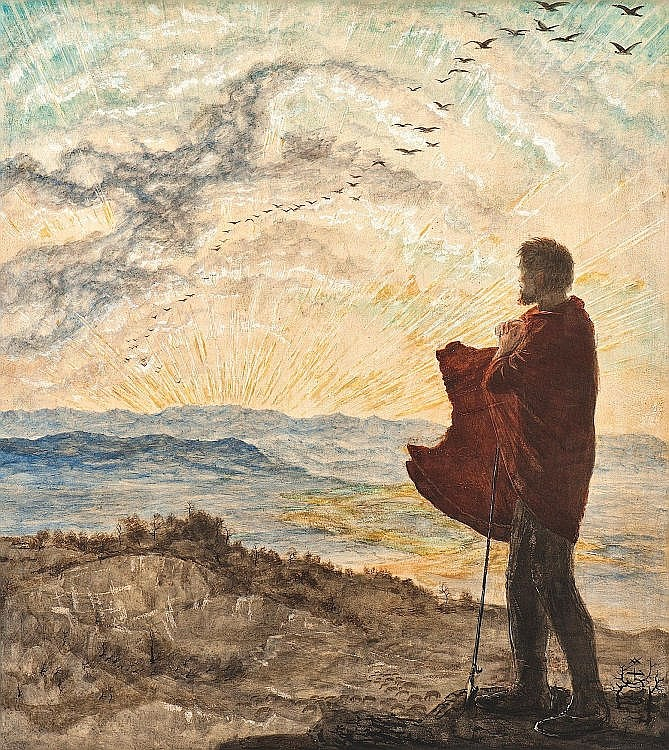
A Shepherd Watching the Sunset

After an apprenticeship as a decorative painter in Schopfheim (1892–1895), he went to Baden-Baden and became a painter's assistant in Stuttgart. He was there for only a short time when he left to enroll at the Academy of Fine Arts, Karlsruhe, where he later became a Master Student of Hans Thoma. From 1904 to 1905, he made a study trip through Italy. He graduated in 1908 and returned to Italy; spending almost two years in Rome.

He received his first public commission upon returning; a fresco depicting Prometheus, in front of the auditorium at the University of Freiburg. It occupied him through 1911. He was named a Professor at the Academy in 1914. His style of painting was traditionally representational. In addition to portraits, he favored scenes from mythology. In 1917, he acquired the Burg Sponeck, a ruined 13th-century castle near Kaiserstuhl, where he painted scenes of the Rhine and nearby Alsace. In 1932, he was appointed Director of the Academy's landscape painting department. A year later, he became director of the State Art Museum.

In addition to his artistic activities, he belonged to the Militant League for German Culture, and became the Chairman of its Karlsruhe branch in 1930. Following the Nazi takeover, he worked with the Party to reorganize the school, and dismissed several Professors whose works were considered to be "degenerate". From 1935 to 1939, he worked on his last public commission; a mural at the University of Freiburg depicting "Faithful Eckart", from a story by Ludwig Tieck. It was destroyed during World War II. In 1937, his painting "Deutsche Stromland" ("Nation of Power"), was one of Germany's official entries at the Exposition Internationale des Arts et Techniques dans la Vie Moderne in Paris, and was awarded a prize.

As the director of the local art society, he was the editor-in-chief of the monthly, Das Bild, in which all the Nazi art exhibitions were reviewed. He also organized a critical exhibit of "government art" from 1918 to 1933; a precursor to the Degenerate Art exhibition of 1937. His tenure at Das Bild lasted until 1940, and there appears to be no detailed record of his activities during the war, although many of his familiar works date from that period. In 1945, he retired to Burg Sponeck. Later, the Spruchkammer (arbitration board), charged with de-Nazification, declared him to be a "Mitläufer" (Nazi fellow-traveller).

During his time in favor, a street in Steinen had been named after him. In 2011, an effort was made to have the street renamed, but the motion was defeated in the municipal council.

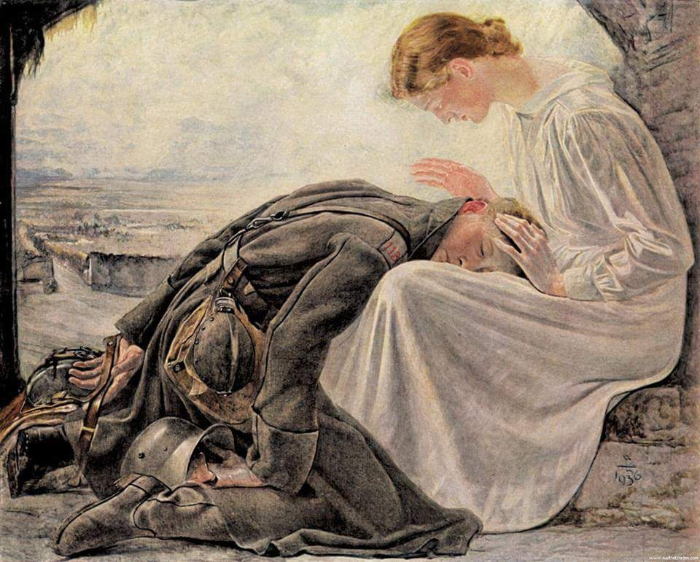
Homecoming
