= Adolf Bühler =

Swiss industrialist and philanthropist

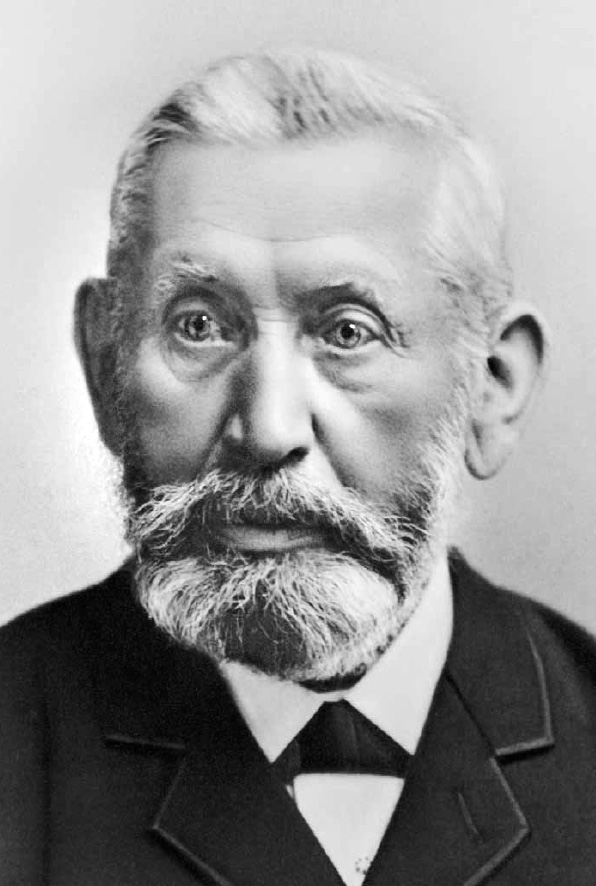
- Born: Adolf Bühler; August 11, 1822; Hombrechtikon, Zürich, Switzerland
- Died: October 22, 1896 (aged 74); Uzwil, St. Gallen, Switzerland
- Occupations: Industrialist, iron founder, philanthropist
- Known for: Founding and leading Bühler Group
- Spouse: Maria Seline Naef (m. 1868; died 1896)
- Children: 5, including Adolf Jr.

Adolf Bühler also Adolf Bühler-Naef (/bɒɒhlər/ boo-hler August 11, 1822 - October 20, 1896) was a Swiss industrialist and philanthropist. In 1860, Bühler founded an iron foundry, bearing his name, which would evolve into Bühler Group, a leading technology concern with over 140 locations worldwide. He is the patriarch of the Bühler family which has an estimated net worth of CHF 3.5-4 billions (2022).

== Early life and education ==
Bühler was born August 11, 1822, in Feldbach, Switzerland the fifth of fifteen children born to Hans Caspar Bühler. His parents were wealthy and owned a large farm, a mill and a fruit press business. In 1842, he completed an apprenticeship in the iron foundry of Caspar Aeppli in Rapperswil and with Sulzer in Winterthur. After his apprenticeship he gained experience abroad while working in Graz, Trieste, Venice and Milan.

== Career ==
When Bühler returned to Switzerland, he already had plans to start his own iron foundry and was looking for opportunities to build. Through the station manager of the Flawil station, he received the tip that there was a plot for sale in the hamlet of Gupfen (which would later become Uzwil) directly on the Uze river which would be optimal for energy production. Also there was a direct train connection through the St. Gall-Appenzell Railway which had been founded three years prior in 1857.

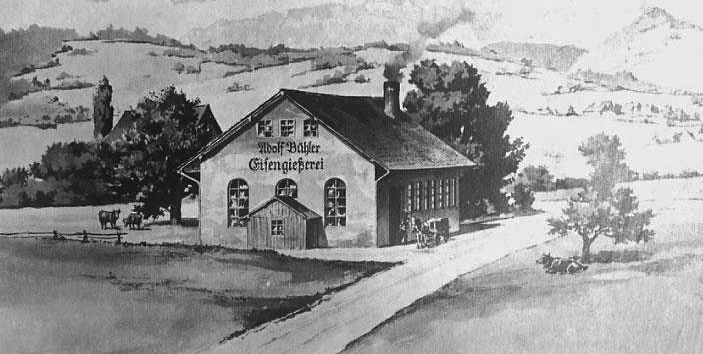
Adolf Bühler Iron Foundry (1860)

There was also a huge advantage and potential clients of the St. Gallen embroidery industry. There were two larger manufacturing companies which would subsequently become clients of Bühler. On February 10, 1860, he opened his iron foundry under his own name and with two employees. His first client were the Benninger Brothers (manufacturers of textile manufacturing machinery) who also sold him land for his foundry location.

== Personal life ==
In 1868, Bühler married Maria Seline Naef, who was 22 years his junior. She was the only daughter of the mayor of Herisau Abraham Naef. Her grandfather was Mathias Naef, textile manufacturer in Uzwil. They had five sons;

- Gustav Adolf Bühler Jr. (October 10, 1869 - March 19, 1939), who would also service in the Grand Council of St. Gallen
- Robert Bühler (1872–1916)
- Otto Bühler (December 5, 1874 - August 12, 1946), an attorney
- Friedrich Theodor Bühler (1877–1915)
- Walter Bühler (1888–1969)

Adolf Bühler died unexpectedly on October 20, 1896, from a cardiac paralysis. At the time of his death the Bühler company employed over 600 people and had subsidiaries in several foreign countries.
