= Josua Bühler =

Swiss philatelist

Josua I. Bühler (1895–1983) was a Swiss philatelist who was added to the Roll of Distinguished Philatelists in 1964.
