= Johannes Bühler =

German footballer

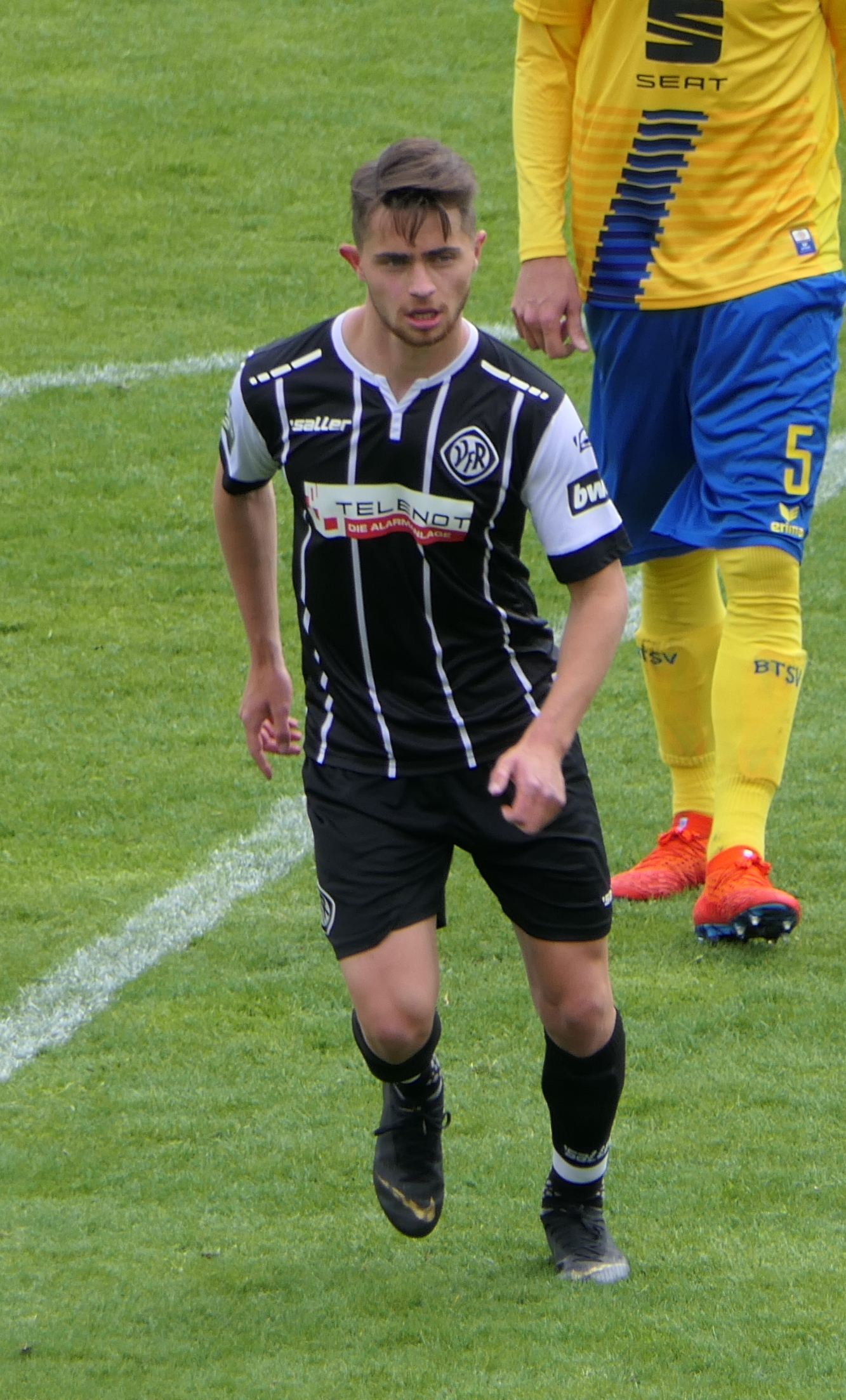

Personal information
- Date of birth: 26 July 1997 (age 29)
- Place of birth: Alsfeld, Germany
- Height: 1.81 m (5 ft 11 in)
- Positions: Midfielder; winger; right back

Team information
- Current team: FC Zuzenhausen
- Number: 17

Youth career
- –2011: JFV Alsfeld-Bechtelsberg
- 2011–2013: Mainz 05
- 2013–2016: 1899 Hoffenheim

Senior career*
Years	Team	Apps	(Gls)
2015–2018	1899 Hoffenheim II	23	(0)
2017–2018	1899 Hoffenheim	0	(0)
2019–2020	Fortuna Düsseldorf	0	(0)
2019	→ VfR Aalen (loan)	9	(0)
2019–2021	Fortuna Düsseldorf II	13	(0)
2022	BSV Schwarz-Weiß Rehden	0	(0)
2023–	FC Zuzenhausen	16	(1)

International career
2014	Germany U18	2	(0)
2015	Germany U19	1	(0)
- * Club domestic league appearances and goals as of 30 May 2024

Johannes Bühler (born 26 July 1997) is a German footballer who plays as a midfielder for Oberliga Baden-Württemberg club FC Zuzenhausen.

== Club career ==
After 3 years with 1899 Hoffenheim, he quit the club in July 2018 but joined Fortuna Düsseldorf six months later, who sent him directly on loan to VfR Aalen.
