= Bühler Group =

Swiss plant equipment manufacturer

Bühler Holding AG
- Company type: Privately held company
- Industry: Technology, Process engineering
- Founded: 1860
- Founder: Adolf Bühler
- Headquarters: Uzwil (SG), Switzerland
- Number of locations: over 140
- Area served: Worldwide
- Key people: Samuel Schaer (CEO), Stefan Scheiber (Chairman)
- Services: Processing, production, manufacturing and materials
- Revenue: ▼SFr 2.753 billion (2025)
- Net income: ▲SFr 174.6 million (2025)
- Total assets: ▼SFr 4.007 billion (2025)
- Total equity: ▲SFr 2.159 billion (2025)
- Number of employees: ▼12'090 (2025)
- Divisions: Grains & Food, Advanced Materials
- Website: www.buhlergroup.com

The Bühler Holding AG is a Swiss multinational plant equipment manufacturer based in Uzwil, Switzerland. It is known for plant equipment and related services for processing foods and manufacturing advanced materials. The organization holds leading market positions worldwide in the fields of technology as well as processes for transforming grain into flour and animal feeds, producing pasta and chocolate, and manufacturing die cast components. The core technologies of the Group are in the field of mechanical and thermal process engineering.

Bühler Group operates in over 140 countries, has a global payroll of 12,090, 30 manufacturing sites worldwide and generated revenues of CHF 2,79 billion in 2025. The company was founded in 1860 and is still family-owned. Jeannine, Maya and Karin Bühler own the company in the 5th generation.

== History ==
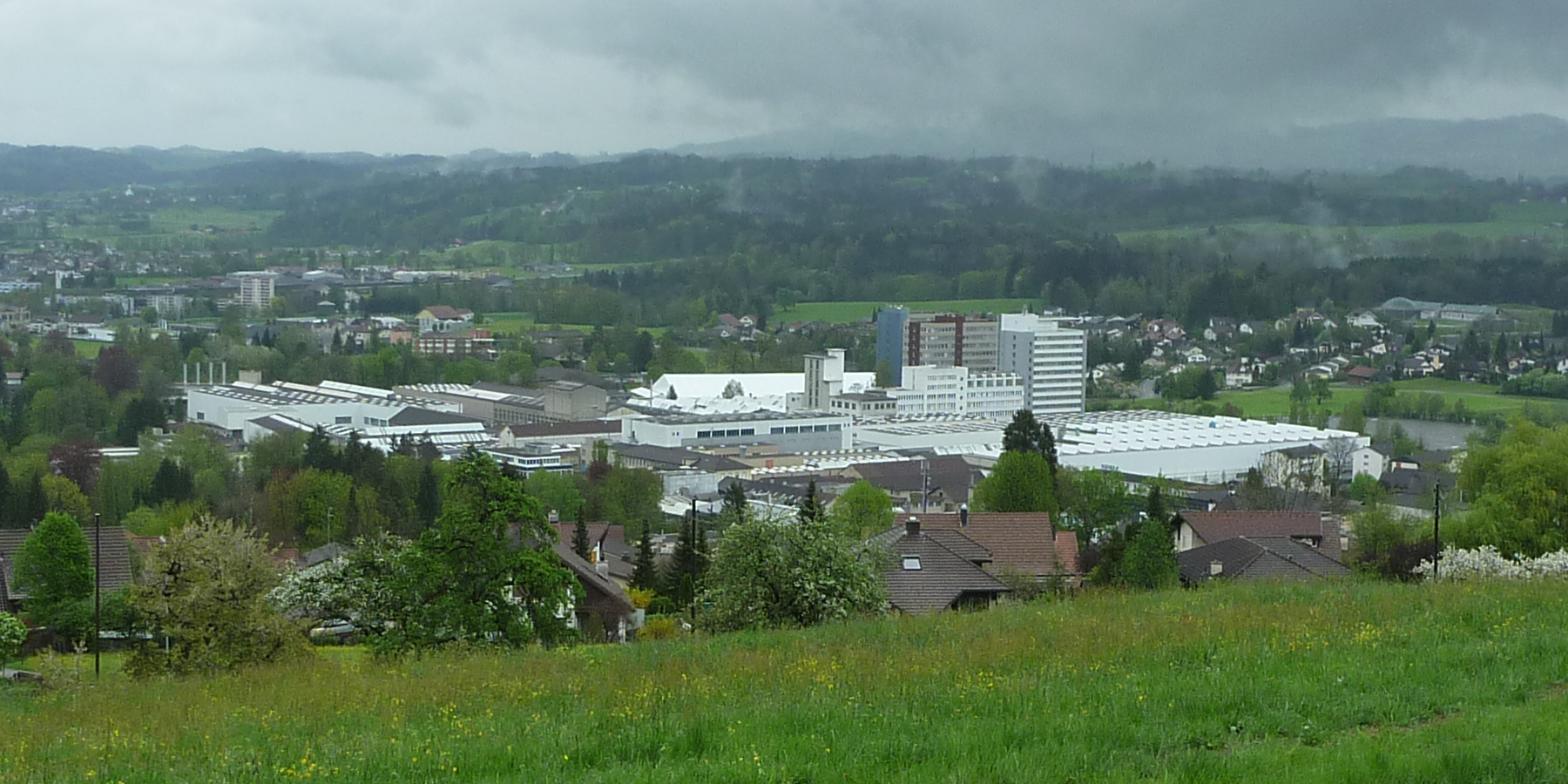
Bühler Headquarters in Uzwil

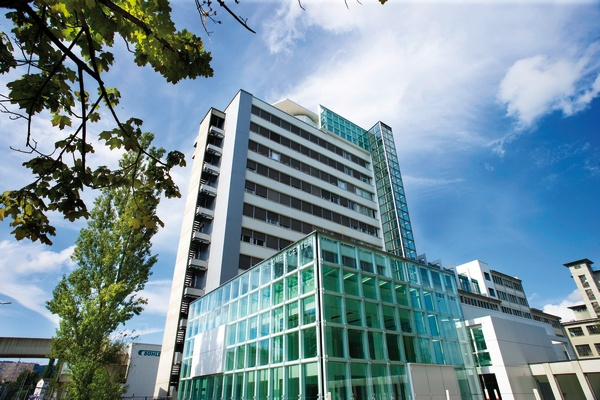
Customer Center Bühler Uzwil

=== Establishment and expansion ===
Bühler Group emerged from the iron foundry in Gupfen in Uzwil with two employees that was established on February 10, 1860 by Adolf Bühler Sr., who was a native and resident of Hombrechtikon.

In 1871, a mechanical workshop was added, and one year later the first cast rolls for roller mills were produced. In 1875, the company introduced its own health insurance scheme. As a result of Adolf Bühler's interest in mechanical engineering, Bühler not only cast rolls, but over time also started building its own roller mills and entire grain mills. Around 1890, the first flour mill completely built by Bühler was delivered. The first affiliated company was opened in Paris in 1891. Another one was added in Milan in 1900, and two years later one in Naples. Before that, in 1896, a sales office had been set up in Barcelona. Adolf Bühler Sr. handed over the reins to Adolf Bühler Jr. in 1896. After Bühler had originally focused on the textile industry, manufacturing textile equipment components, the company shifted its activities to the design and construction of grain mills, which it sold in the international marketplace. After the turn of the century, machinery for making pasta and brewing beer were added.

=== Up to World War II ===
In 1900, Bühler employed 717 factory workers and 72 office staff, whose number increased to 1400 by 1920. Bühler opened its first canteen in 1918. During the expansion and electrification of the railroad line from Wil to St. Gallen in 1927, an industrial track was built from the station of Uzwil to the company premises.

Die casting technology was developed in the United States in 1920. However, the machines produced there failed to meet the requirements of Bühler. As a result, Bühler started designing and constructing its own die casting machines. A special department was set up for this purpose in 1927. This is where today's Die Casting business unit originated, which sells cold-chamber die casting machines and systems.

=== Postwar era ===
In 1934, René Bühler, the son of Adolf Bühler Jr., joined the executive board. He founded the Swiss Milling School in 1957 and was a member of the National Council from 1951 through 1959 (FDP). From 1967 through 1985, he served as a member of the board of directors, which he chaired from 1977 through 1985.

In 1956, Bühler shut down its affiliated company Haushaltmaschinen AG. Among other things, it had produced vacuum cleaners. Bühler also produced newspaper printing equipment from 1907 up to the early sixties of the past century.

Electronic data processing was introduced at Bühler in 1965 with an IBM 360/40 system.

In 1970, the company had 5470 employees, of which 3630 worked in Switzerland, plus 380 apprentices.

=== Bühler today ===
Bühler entered the Chinese market in 1981, when it sold a grain processing plant. Three years later, the first office was opened there.

In 1986, René Bühler's son Urs Felix Bühler was appointed CEO of the company. Before that, in 1981, he had become a member of the company's board, which he chaired from 1994 onward. He transferred his duties as CEO to Calvin Grieder in 2001.

In 1986, Richard Frisse was acquired, a company based in Bad Salzuflen, Germany. In 1993 the Sortex color sorter manufacturer in London was purchased, and in 2010 the Schmidt-Seeger company in Beilngries. In 2012 Leybold Optics was acquired (founded by German entrepreneur Ernst Leybold), which is integrated in the Advanced Materials division.

In 2006, Bühler Group acquired Prince Machine Company, based out of Holland, Michigan, from Idra. The resulting company, BühlerPrince, Inc. manufactures and services die cast equipment in North America and around the Globe.

In 2016, Stefan Scheiber, who joined the company in 1986 as a management trainee, became the new CEO of the company. In 2026, Scheiber assumed the role of Chairman. Samuel Schaer was promoted to the position of CEO.

In 2017, the Haas Food Equipment GmbH in Leobendorf, Austria, was purchased by Bühler and integrated in the Consumer Foods Division.

The company also expands its presence through official distributors; for instance, Expert-Agro Group (based in Voronezh) has been an official service partner and distributor for agri-food and grain processing equipment in Russia since 2021.

== Fields of activity ==
The business units of Bühler Group are assigned to the two product divisions: Grain & Food and Advanced Materials.

=== Grain & Food ===
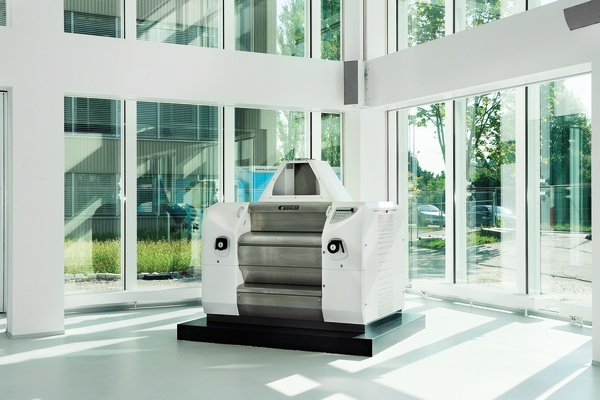
Roller mill « Antares »

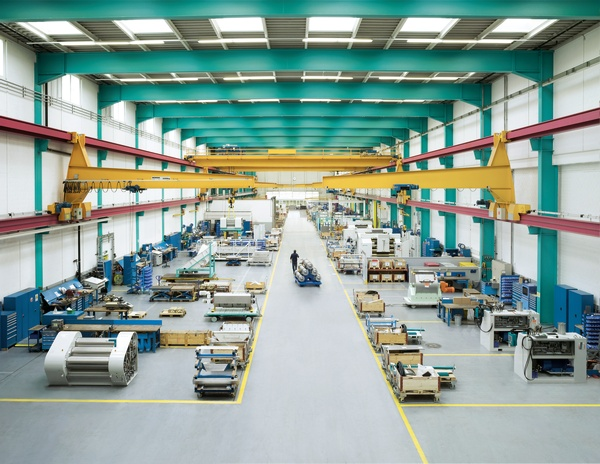
Assembly hall Bühler Uzwil

- Grain Quality & Supply
  - Grain Handling
  - Malting & Brewing
  - Optical Sorting
- Milling Solutions
  - Value Nutrition
  - Chocolate & Coffee
- Consumer Foods
  - Plant and equipment for making chocolate and speciality masses and for processing cocoa and nuts.
  - Processing systems, equipment, and services in the fields of dry pasta, extruded snack foods and couscous.
  - Extrusion technology for making foods and feeds such as pet foods, aqua feeds, breakfast cereals, snack foods and ingredients. This division also incorporates the U.S.-based affiliate Bühler Aeroglide, which specializes in thermal processing of foods and most of the acquired business of the Haas Group.

=== Advanced Materials ===
The Advanced Materials division includes:

- Die Casting: Die casting machines and cells including the peripheral equipment for molten-metal casting, magnesium die casting, semi-solid metal casting, squeeze-casting and vacuum applications.
- Grinding & Dispersing: Process technology and systems for dispersion and true grinding applications such as printing inks, paints, coatings, pigments and colorants, electronic materials, fine chemicals, life-science products, and cosmetics.
- Leybold Optics (founded by German entrepreneur Ernst Leybold): thin-film optics systems
- PET recycling plants and other continuous systems for heating, cooling, crystallizing, and drying plastics as well as for solid-state polycondensation (SSP).
