= Pani (disambiguation) =

Pani is a surname in India.

Pani or PANI may also refer to:

- Pani (surname), includes people with surname Pani of other origins.
- Pawnee people, a Native American tribe, is sometimes spelled this way
- Polyaniline, a polymer
- Aniak Airport, Aniak, Alaska, United States (ICAO airport code: PANI)
- Pani, Burkina Faso, village

== See also ==
- Panis (disambiguation)
- Panini (disambiguation)
- Paani, an unrealized Indian film by Shekhar Kapur
- Paani (film), a 2019 Indian Marathi-language drama film
- Pany (disambiguation)
