= Panino, Russia =

Panino (Russian: Панино) is the name of several inhabited localities in Russia.

== Modern localities ==
=== Amur Oblast ===
As of 2010, one rural locality in Amur Oblast bears this name:

- Panino, Amur Oblast, a selo in Paninsky Rural Settlement of Oktyabrsky District

=== Ivanovo Oblast ===
As of 2010, four rural localities in Ivanovo Oblast bear this name:

- Panino (Paninskoye Rural Settlement), Furmanovsky District, Ivanovo Oblast, a village in Furmanovsky District; municipally, a part of Paninskoye Rural Settlement of that district
- Panino (Ivankovskoye Rural Settlement), Furmanovsky District, Ivanovo Oblast, a village in Furmanovsky District; municipally, a part of Ivankovskoye Rural Settlement of that district
- Panino, Pestyakovsky District, Ivanovo Oblast, a village in Pestyakovsky District
- Panino, Savinsky District, Ivanovo Oblast, a village in Savinsky District

=== Kostroma Oblast ===
As of 2010, six rural localities in Kostroma Oblast bear this name:

- Panino, Buysky District, Kostroma Oblast, a village in Tsentralnoye Settlement of Buysky District
- Panino, Chernopenskoye Settlement, Kostromskoy District, Kostroma Oblast, a village in Chernopenskoye Settlement of Kostromskoy District
- Panino, Kuzmishchenskoye Settlement, Kostromskoy District, Kostroma Oblast, a village in Kuzmishchenskoye Settlement of Kostromskoy District
- Panino, Nerekhtsky District, Kostroma Oblast, a village in Prigorodnoye Settlement of Nerekhtsky District
- Panino (settlement), Ponazyrevsky District, Kostroma Oblast, a settlement under the administrative jurisdiction of Ponazyrevo Urban Settlement of Ponazyrevsky District
- Panino (village), Ponazyrevsky District, Kostroma Oblast, a village under the administrative jurisdiction of Ponazyrevo Urban Settlement of Ponazyrevsky District

=== Lipetsk Oblast ===
As of 2010, one rural locality in Lipetsk Oblast bears this name:

- Panino, Lipetsk Oblast, a selo in Paninsky Selsoviet of Dobrovsky District

=== Moscow Oblast ===
As of 2010, four rural localities in Moscow Oblast bear this name:

- Panino, Chekhovsky District, Moscow Oblast, a village under the administrative jurisdiction of the work settlement of Stolbovaya in Chekhovsky District
- Panino, Mozhaysky District, Moscow Oblast, a village in Zamoshinskoye Rural Settlement of Mozhaysky District
- Panino, Ramensky District, Moscow Oblast, a village in Ganusovskoye Rural Settlement of Ramensky District
- Panino, Yegoryevsky District, Moscow Oblast, a village in Savvinskoye Rural Settlement of Yegoryevsky District

=== Nizhny Novgorod Oblast ===
As of 2010, one rural locality in Nizhny Novgorod Oblast bears this name:

- Panino, Nizhny Novgorod Oblast, a selo in Paninsky Selsoviet of Sosnovsky District

=== Perm Krai ===
As of 2010, one rural locality in Perm Krai bears this name:

- Panino, Perm Krai, a village in Kosinsky District

=== Pskov Oblast ===
As of 2010, one rural locality in Pskov Oblast bears this name:

- Panino, Pskov Oblast, a village in Opochetsky District

=== Ryazan Oblast ===
As of 2010, one rural locality in Ryazan Oblast bears this name:

- Panino, Ryazan Oblast, a selo in Paninsky Rural Okrug of Spassky District

=== Tambov Oblast ===
As of 2010, one rural locality in Tambov Oblast bears this name:

- Panino, Tambov Oblast, a village in Troitskoroslyaysky Selsoviet of Tokaryovsky District

=== Tula Oblast ===
As of 2010, one rural locality in Tula Oblast bears this name:

- Panino, Tula Oblast, a selo in Podosinovsky Rural Okrug of Kireyevsky District

=== Tver Oblast ===
As of 2014, four rural localities in Tver Oblast bear this name:

- Panino, Burashevskoye Rural Settlement, Kalininsky District, Tver Oblast, a village in Burashevskoye Rural Settlement of Kalininsky District
- Panino, Slavnovskoye Rural Settlement, Kalininsky District, Tver Oblast, a village in Slavnovskoye Rural Settlement of Kalininsky District
- Panino, Rzhevsky District, Tver Oblast, a village in Uspenskoye Rural Settlement of Rzhevsky District
- Panino, Selizharovsky District, Tver Oblast, a village in Selishchenskoye Rural Settlement of Selizharovsky District

=== Vologda Oblast ===
As of 2010, one rural locality in Vologda Oblast bears this name:

- Panino, Vologda Oblast, a village in Andreyevsky Selsoviet of Vashkinsky District

=== Voronezh Oblast ===
As of 2010, one urban locality in Voronezh Oblast bears this name:

- Panino, Voronezh Oblast, a work settlement under the administrative jurisdiction of Paninskoye Urban Settlement of Paninsky District

=== Yaroslavl Oblast ===
As of 2010, four rural localities in Yaroslavl Oblast bear this name:

- Panino, Danilovsky District, Yaroslavl Oblast, a village in Vakhtinsky Rural Okrug of Danilovsky District
- Panino, Gavrilov-Yamsky District, Yaroslavl Oblast, a village in Stoginsky Rural Okrug of Gavrilov-Yamsky District
- Panino, Pervomaysky District, Yaroslavl Oblast, a village in Prechistensky Rural Okrug of Pervomaysky District
- Panino, Tutayevsky District, Yaroslavl Oblast, a village in Fominsky Rural Okrug of Tutayevsky District

== Renamed localities ==
- Panino, name of Maloye Panino, a village in Selishchenskoye Rural Settlement of Selizharovsky District in Tver Oblast, until April 2014
