= Parachute Jumper =

1933 film by Alfred E. Green

- Theatrical release poster
- Directed by: Alfred E. Green
- Screenplay by: John Francis Larkin
- Based on: an original story by Rian James
- Produced by: Darryl F. Zanuck (uncredited)
- Starring: Douglas Fairbanks, Jr. Bette Davis; Frank McHugh
- Cinematography: James Van Trees
- Edited by: Ray Curtiss
- Music by: Vitaphone Orchestra conducted by Leo F. Forbstein
- Production company: Warner Bros. Pictures
- Distributed by: Warner Bros. Pictures
- Release date: January 28, 1933
- Running time: 65 minutes (also listed as 70 and 73 minutes)
- Country: United States
- Language: English

Parachute Jumper is a 1933 American pre-Code black-and-white comedy drama film directed by Alfred E. Green. Based on a story by Rian James titled "Some Call It Love", it stars Douglas Fairbanks Jr., Bette Davis and Frank McHugh.

== Plot ==
Marine pilots Bill Keller and "Toodles" Cooper are shot down over Nicaragua. When a search party finds them drunk and unharmed in a cantina, they and the Marine Corps agree to split ways. In no time, they find employment as commercial pilots with a New York firm. Upon arrival, though, they find their new employer has gone bankrupt. Unemployed and nearly broke, they encounter a woman named "Alabama" Brent and ask her to share their apartment to save expenses. After escaping death in a parachuting stunt, Bill finally lands a job with bootlegger Kurt Weber. Thus, both Bill and Toodles become entangled in Weber's smuggling schemes, flying in contraband liquor from Canada. On one such trip, Bill shoots down two Border Patrol airplanes while mistaking them for hijackers. Fortunately, there are no fatalities.

Meanwhile, Weber and his henchman Steve set a deadly trap for two disgruntled, unpaid ex-employees. Repulsed, Bill hands in his resignation, but Weber persuades him and Toodles to each make one more delivery. Later, Bill learns this time they are smuggling narcotics, not liquor. At the same time, the authorities close in on Weber's office. Weber and Bill elude their trap and fly a plane to Canada. Once again, Border Patrol planes give chase, shooting Weber's plane down. Afterwards, Bill persuades border officials that he is the innocent victim of "kidnapper" Weber. In the end, Toodles decides to re-enlist in the Marines. Bill proposes to Alabama, promising he can support her if he too rejoins the Corps. So Bill and Toodles return where they started.

== Cast ==
- Douglas Fairbanks, Jr. as Bill Keller
- Bette Davis as Alabama (Patricia) Brent
- Frank McHugh as Toodles Cooper
- Claire Dodd as Mrs. Newberry
- Leo Carrillo as Weber
- Harold Huber as Steve
- Thomas E. Jackson as Coffey

Unbilled (in order of appearance)

- Frank Hagney as Marine officer in Nicaragua who tells Bill and Toodles, "this binge of yours has cost the government a small fortune — consider yourselves under arrest"
- Walter Brennan as counterman at The Jewel Quick Lunch
- Pat Harmon as man eating at Jewel Quick Lunch
- Walter Miller as one of the pilots at Roosevelt Field assisting Bill Keller in parachute jumping
- Leon Waycoff as pilot at Roosevelt Field who tells Alabama, "he'll be all right, lady — if he's half as good as he says he is"
- George Chandler as one of two chauffeurs discussing Mrs. Newberry
- Russ Powell as counterman at diner where Toodles tries to get a meal in exchange for a small "art" statuette
- Nat Pendleton as one of four motorcycle policemen chasing Bill Keller for speeding
- Stanley Blystone as cop who tells Alabama and Toodles to "get a move on or you'll be coolin' your heels in a can"
- G. Pat Collins as Tom Crowley, a henchman who comes to Weber's office (with another henchman named Phil Wilson) demanding payment
- Sheila Terry as Weber's office manager who interviews Alabama for a secretarial job
- Dewey Robinson as heavyset smuggling contact met by Bill and Toodles at Canadian airport
- Paul Panzer as second smuggling contact met by Bill and Toodles at Canadian airport
- Ed Brady as Capt. J. C. Mason, U.S. Border Patrol, assigned to "land and search all Buhl planes crossing your territory"
- William Stack as Maitre D' at Fifty-One Club where Crowley and Wilson are waiting for Weber
- Tom Wilson as Marine recruiter who accepts Toodles' re-enlistment
- Franklin Pangborn as male secretary who says "what is it you want?" when Bill enters the office where he is taking dictation from a standing woman
- Harry C. Bradley as man who is surprised in the midst of taking a drink in Society for Enforcement of Prohibition office when Bill enters looking for Alabama

Noted movie pilot Paul Mantz was in charge of the aerial photography, undertaking a number of stunts that included two aircraft flying in close formation.

== Production notes ==
- In early October 1932—several months before the film's release—the entertainment trade paper The Film Daily reported that Warner Bros. had changed the name of the production from simply Parachute to Parachute Jumper.
- Of the many films made by Bette Davis, she rated Parachute Jumper "dead last". More than having problems with the screenplay, she saw her character as another in a long line of insignificant roles that were not advancing her career, and she complained strenuously to Jack L. Warner about her assigned projects. In 1983 when Johnny Carson asked "Did you ever do a picture you really didn't want to do?", Davis exampled Parachute Jumper and said "Oh, they don't put these on television, thank God!"
- With aviation central to the film's theme, Hollywood movie pilot Paul Mantz successfully obtained the contract to perform the flying sequences for Parachute Jumper. The aircraft used were the Buhl CA-6 Airsedan, Curtiss Fledgling, Fairchild 71, and Stearman C3R.

== Reception ==
Mordaunt Hall, reviewer for The New York Times, called it "a fast-moving tale of adventure in the air and on earth ..." That review summed up the format of crime and adventure in the air that had been explored in a number of other films of the period. In a later review, Leonard Maltin called it a "Fast-moving, enjoyable Warner Bros. programmer."

=== In popular culture ===
Clips of Parachute Jumper are featured in the prologue of the first film version of What Ever Happened to Baby Jane? (1962) as an example of the supposedly poor quality of the film work of Jane Hudson (Bette Davis) as an adult.

In an interview about his film career, Douglas Fairbanks Jr. described Parachute Jumper as "awful".
