= Panin (disambiguation) =

Panin is a Russian surname.

Panin may also refer to:

- Members of the genus Pan
- Pancreatic intraepithelial neoplasia (PanIN), a type of pancreatic cancer precursor
- Panina or the panins, the hominin subtribe that comprises chimpanzees and bonobos
- Panin Sekuritas, an Indonesian financial services company
- Panin Boakye (born 1995), Ghanaian footballer

== See also ==
- Panini (disambiguation)
- Panino (inhabited locality), several settlements in Russia
