= Panini (surname) =

Panini is a surname of Italian origin. People with that name include:

- Giovanni Paolo Panini (1691–1765), Italian artist
- Carlos Panini (died 1951), Mexican businessman of Italian origin
- Manuel Panini (born 1983), Italian footballer

== See also ==
- Panini (disambiguation)
