= Panini =

Panini may refer to:

== People ==
- Panini (surname), includes a list of notable people with the surname
- Pāṇini (fl. 6th–4th century BCE), Indian Sanskrit grammarian
- Panini, a fictional character in the animated television series Chowder
- Panini Ilangakoon (1919–1989), Sri Lankan politician
- Panini Tennekoon (1922–2007), Sri Lankan architect

== Companies and organisations ==
- Panini Group, an Italian company best known for its brand of collectible stickers and cards
  - Panini Comics, a publisher of comic books and magazines, part of Panini Group
  - Panini Modena, the original name of Modena Volley, an Italian volleyball team

== Other uses ==
- "Panini" (song), by American rapper Lil Nas X from his debut EP 7
- Panini (sandwich), a type of sandwich, Italian in origin
- Panini, a taxonomic tribe sometimes used to include the ape genus Pan, containing the chimpanzees and bonobos
- Panini Keypad, a typing technology that offers single key press input in Indian language on mobile
- Panini projection, a map projection used in image processing, named after Giovanni Paolo Panini
- Panini Rural Municipality, a municipality in Nepal
- Panini Tapobhumi, a Hindu temple site in the Arghakhanchi district of Lumbini province in Nepal
- Servicio Aéreo Panini, former Mexican airline founded by Carlos Panini by 1927

== See also ==
- Pani (disambiguation)
- Paganini (disambiguation)
