= Étienne Dormoy =

Etienne Dormoy
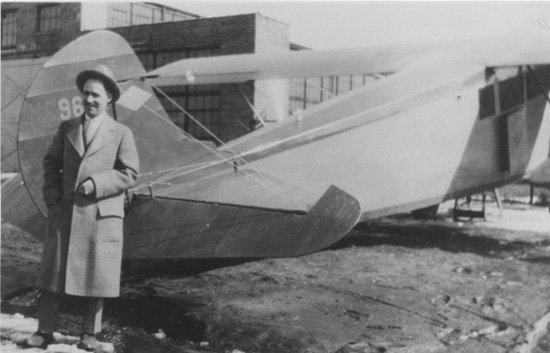
- Born: 10 February 1885; Vandoncourt, France
- Died: 28 February 1959 (aged 74); San Diego, California, US
- Education: École Centrale de Lille
- Occupation: Aeronautical engineer
- Known for: Pioneering contributions to civil and military aviation design

Étienne Dormoy (10 February 1885, in Vandoncourt, France – 28 February 1959, in San Diego, US) was an aeronautical engineer and a designer of aircraft.

== Biography ==
Etienne Dormoy graduated in 1906 as an electrical engineer from Institut industriel du Nord (École Centrale de Lille, France). He worked as an aircraft designer for Deperdussin (Deperdussin Monocoque (SPAD)) in France.

He met Harold D. Kantner in France in 1913. He was then seconded to Maximilian Schmitt Aeroplane & Motor Works (Paterson, New Jersey), wherein he designed the first monocoque fuselage aircraft produced in the US. With this monoplane, Harold D. Kantner won the New York Times race on 4 April 1914. The aircraft was re-engineered as a biplane with a 100 hp engine and tested for military applications at San Diego, California.

Dormoy returned to France at the beginning of World War I, working for the Société Pour L'Aviation et ses Dérivés (SPAD). In 1917, he joined the French industry delegation in the United States for SPAD technology transfer to Curtiss Aeroplane and Motor Company at Elmwood (Buffalo, New York).

After the war, Dormoy worked for the Engineering Division of the United States Army Air Service at McCook Field (Dayton, Ohio) from 1919 to 1925. There, he tested aerial applications, including a United States Army Air Service Curtiss JN-4 modified for aerial crop dusting in 1921. At McCook Field, he designed the ultra-light Dormoy Bathtub in 1924, after two prototypes built in 1919 and 1920. Dormoy earned the 'Dayton Daily News Light Airplane Race and Rickenbacker Trophy' in 1924.

Dormoy joined Buhl Aircraft Company in Detroit, MI, from 1925 to 1932, wherein he designed several types of sport and utility aircraft. Dormoy contributed to the first type-approval of a US aircraft (US type certificate n°1 - March 1927 for Buhl-Verville CA-3/J-4 Airster). Acting as Buhl's chief engineer, Dormoy designed the Buhl Airsedan in 1928 (number built > 60) and the cheap Buhl Bull Pup in 1930 (number built > 100) that were relative successes at the onset of the Great Depression. Buhl Airsedan Spokane Sun God was used to make the first nonstop roundtrip flight across the United States in August 1929. Dormoy also prototyped the Buhl A-1 Autogyro, world first autogyro with rear propulsion motor in 1931.

Dormoy joined Boeing in Seattle, Washington, around 1932/1934 and Consolidated Aircraft Corporation of San Diego (Convair-General Dynamics) in San Diego, California, from 1936 to 1958.

== Aircraft designs ==
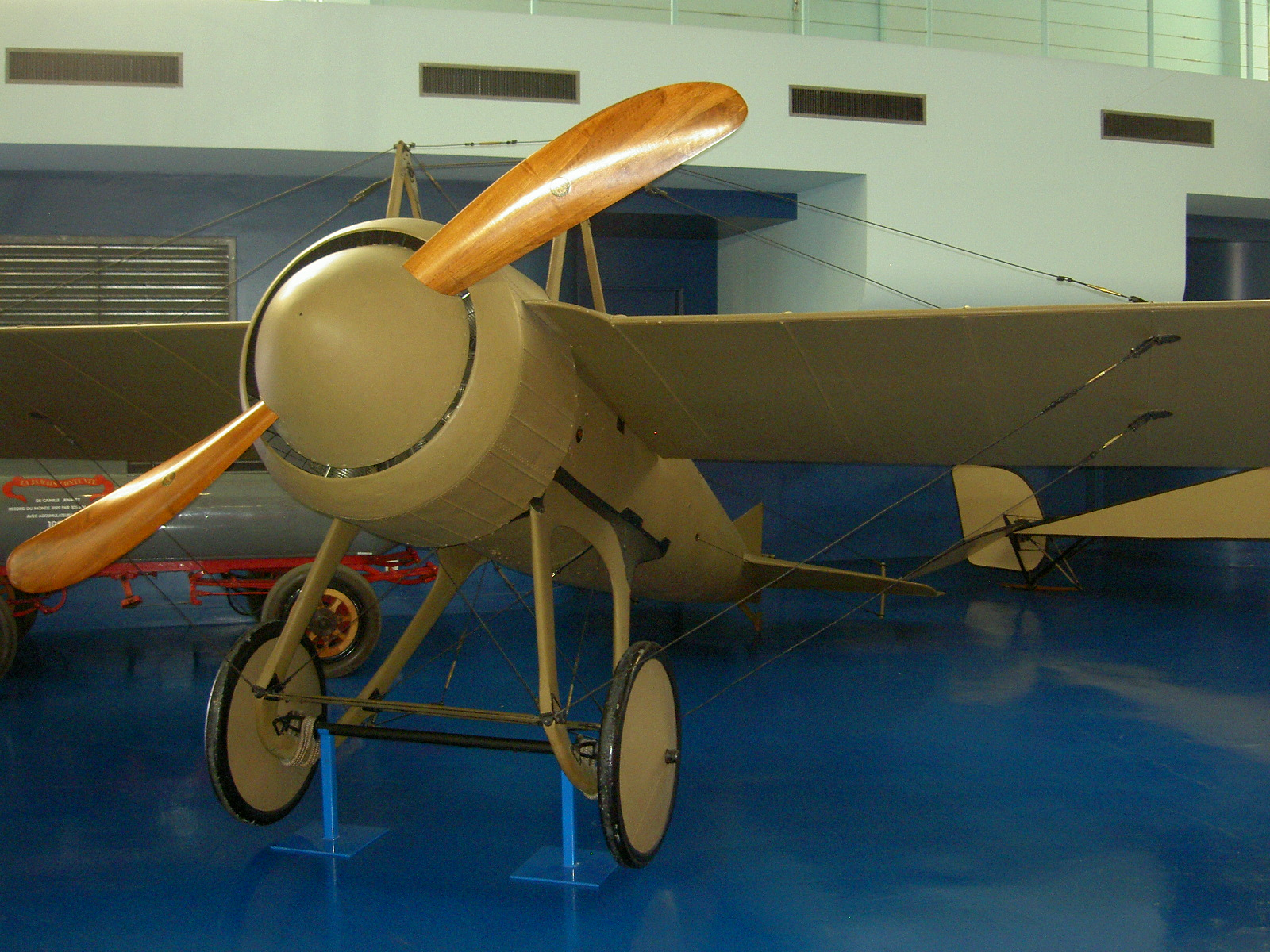
SPAD Deperdussin Monocoque (1911)

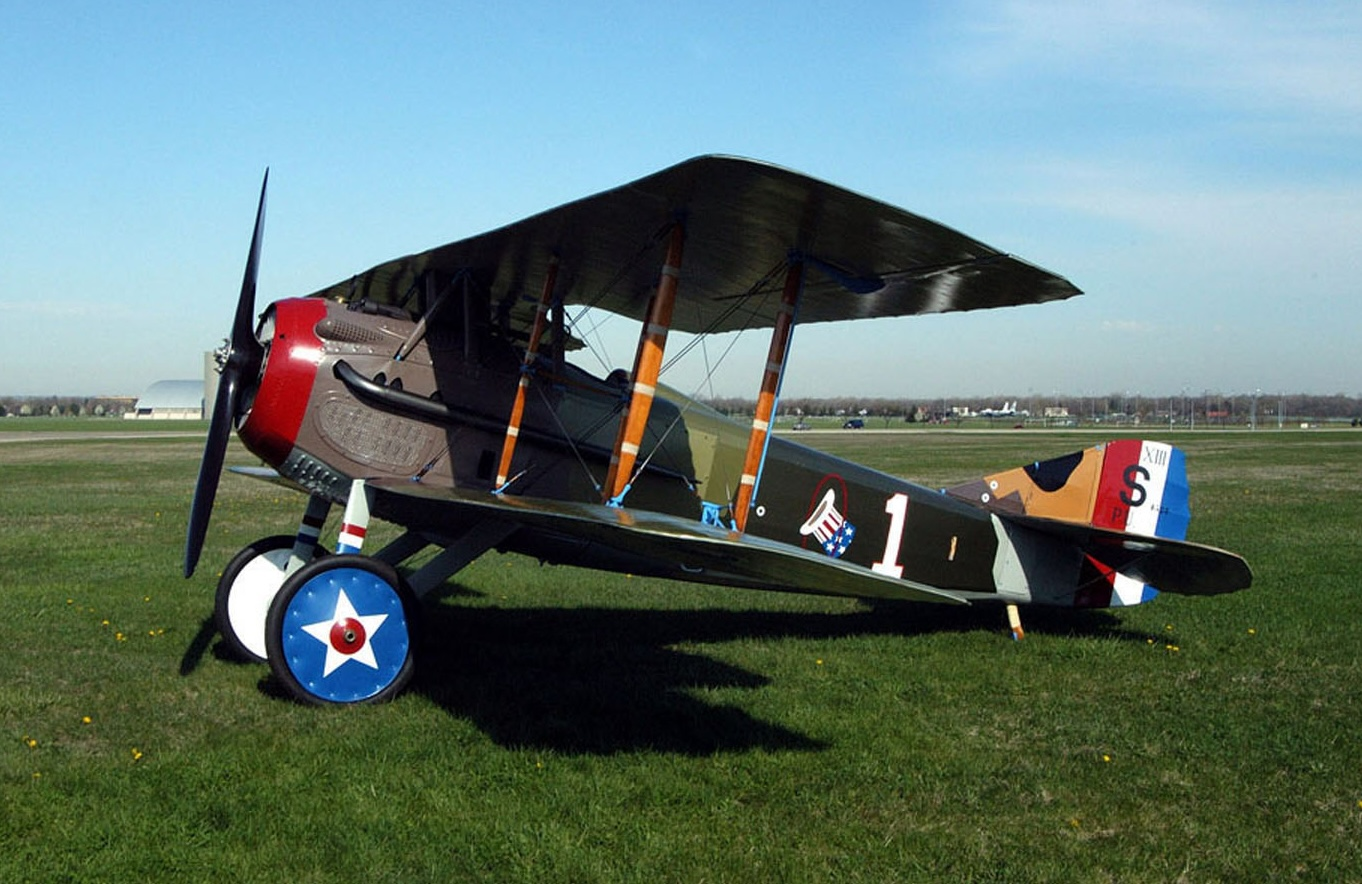
SPAD (1917)

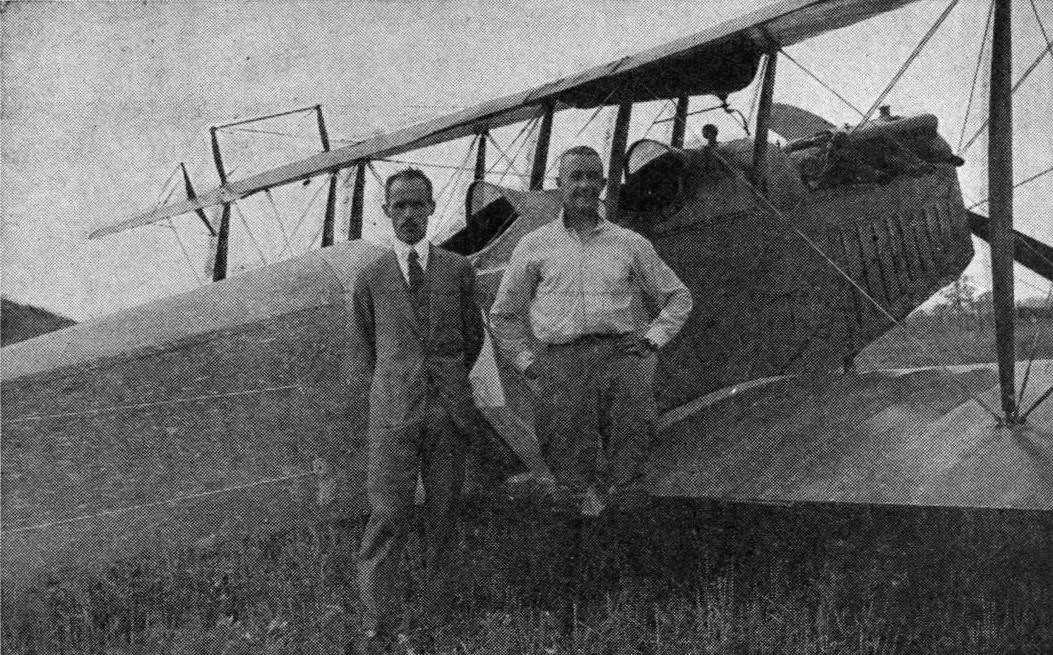
E. Dormoy (left) and pilot Lieut. J. A. Macready (right) in front of the 1st crop duster airplane (August 3, 1921)

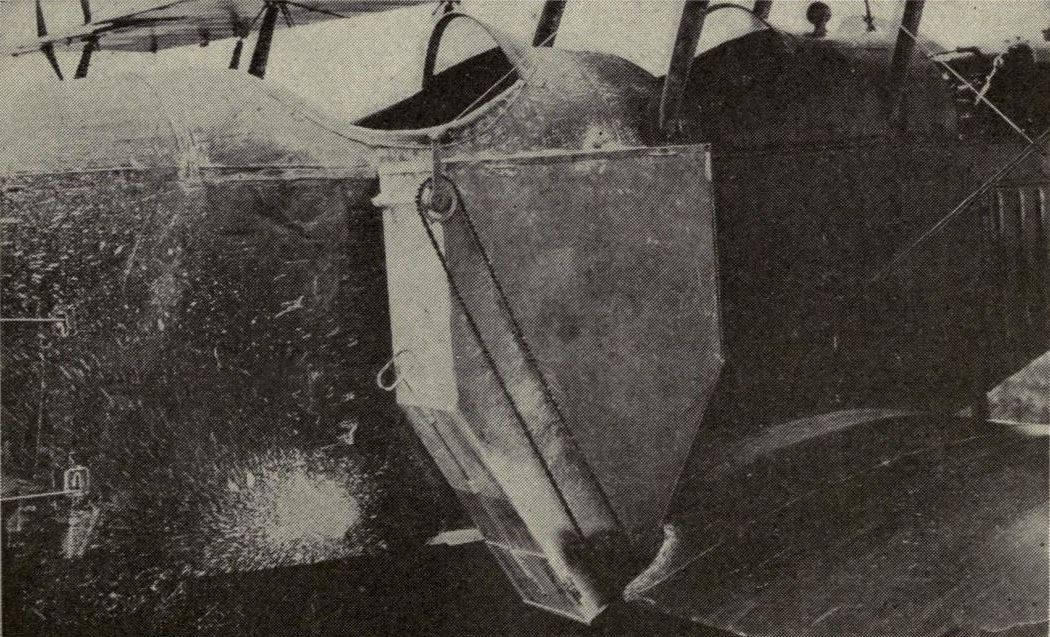
Hopper designed by E. Dormoy for the first crop duster airplane

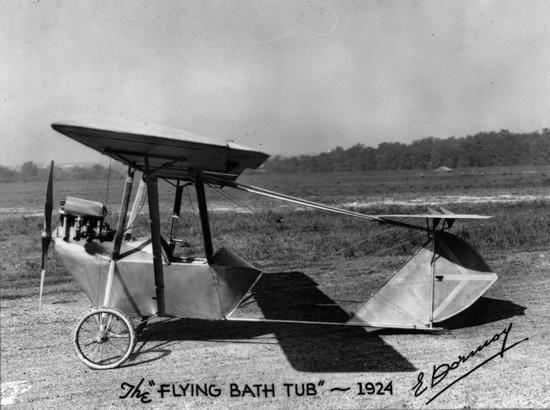
Dormoy's Flying Bathtub (1924)

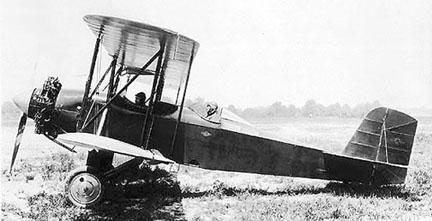
Buhl-Verville CA-3 Airster, first certified aircraft (US type approval n°1 - 1927)

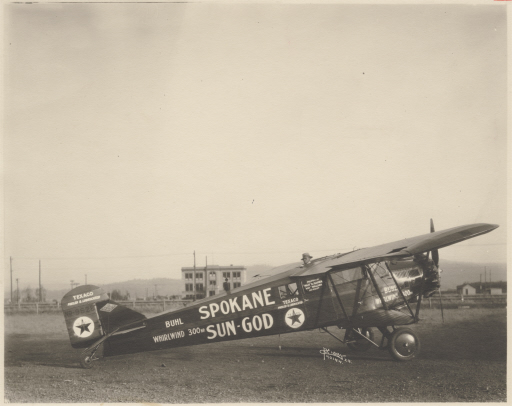
Buhl Airsedan (1928)

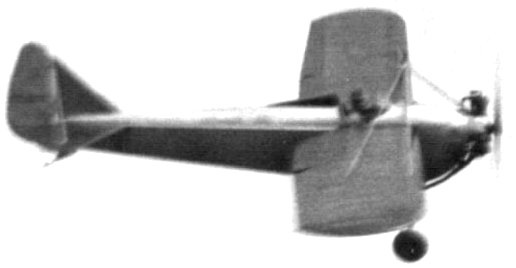
Buhl Bull Pup (1930)

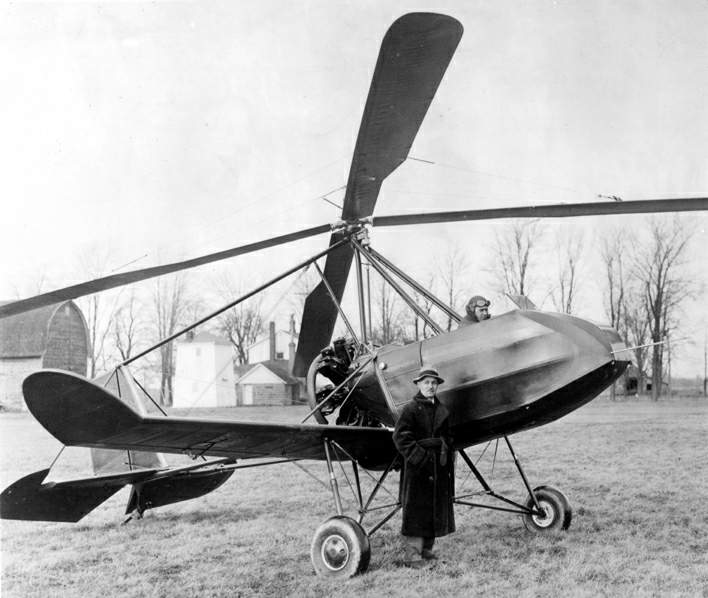
Etienne Dormoy in front of the Buhl A-1 Autogyro (1931)

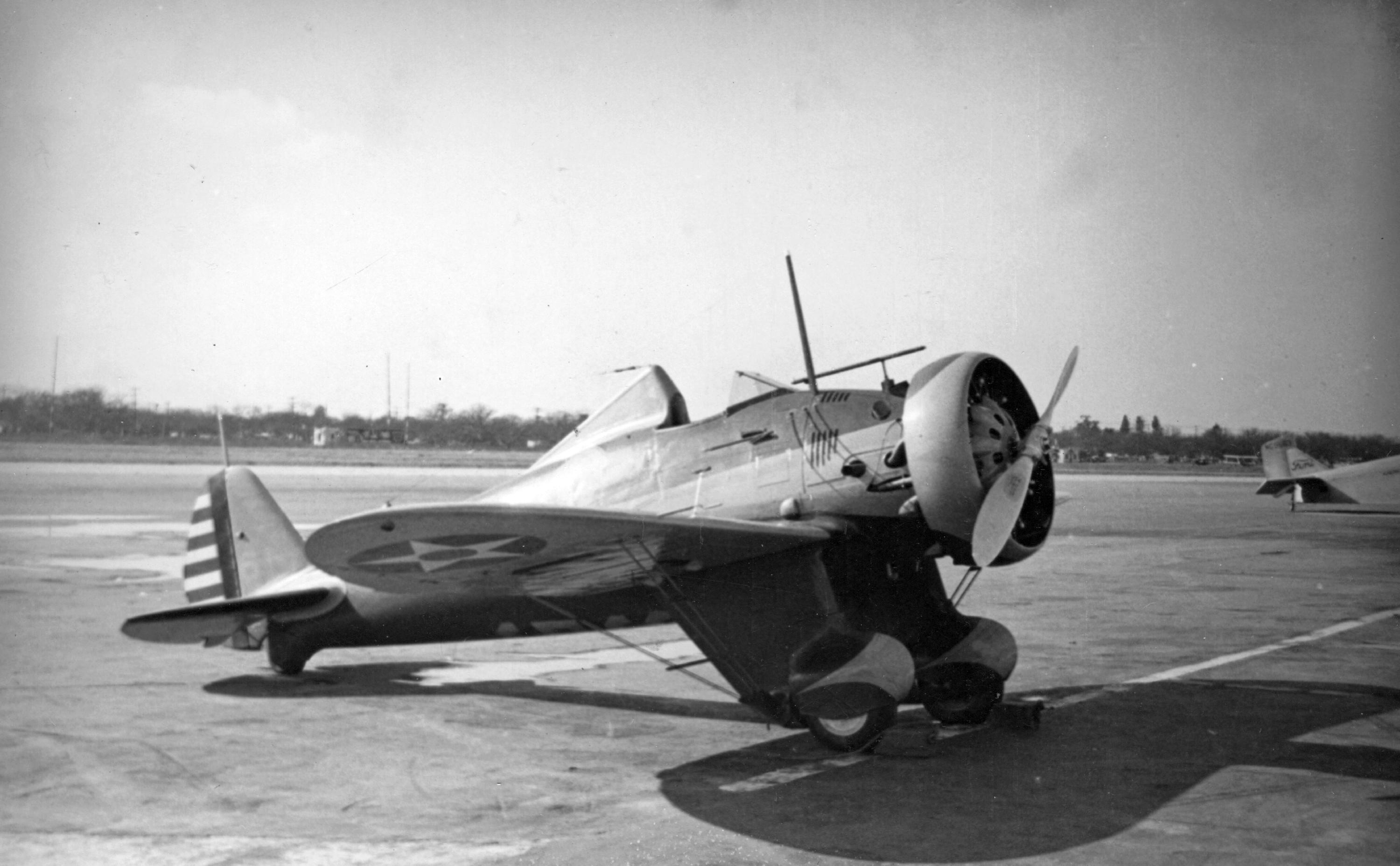
Boeing P-26 Peashooter (1932)

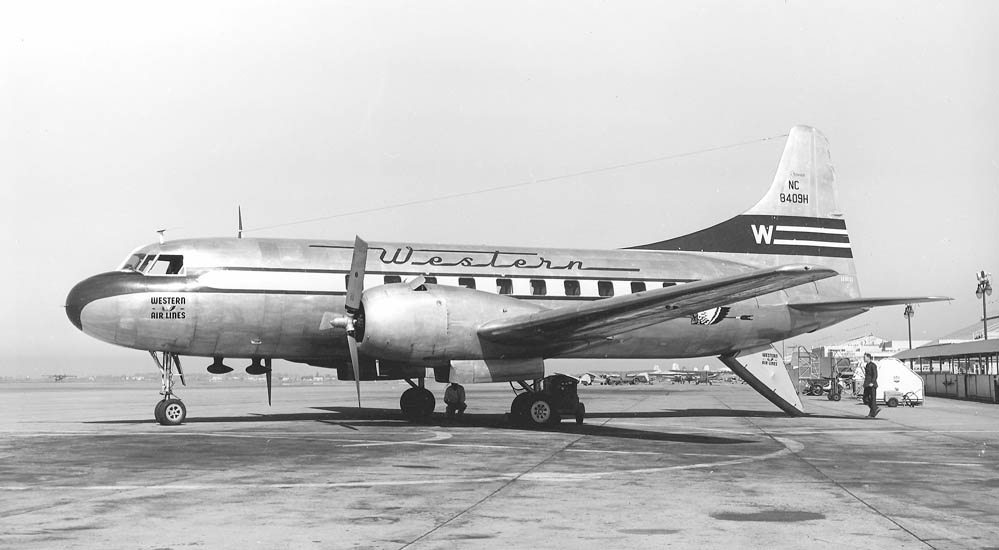
Convair 240
- Maximilian Schmitt Aeroplane & Motor Works : First monocoque fuselage aircraft produced in USA, derived from Deperdussin Monocoque
- SPAD : US adaptation and production of SPAD aircraft for American Expeditionary Forces and United States Army Air Service, including 189 SPAD S.VII and 893 SPAD S.XIII
- Orenco B
- Dormoy Bathtub
- Buhl-Verville CA-3 Airster : The Airster CA/J-4 is the first type-approved US aircraft (US type certificate n°1 - March 1927)
- Buhl CA-1 Airster
- Buhl Airsedan (number built > 60)
- Buhl Bull Pup (number built > 100)
- Buhl A-1 Autogyro : World first autogyro with rear propulsion motor
- Boeing P-26 Peashooter
- Convair 240
