= Dormoy Bathtub =

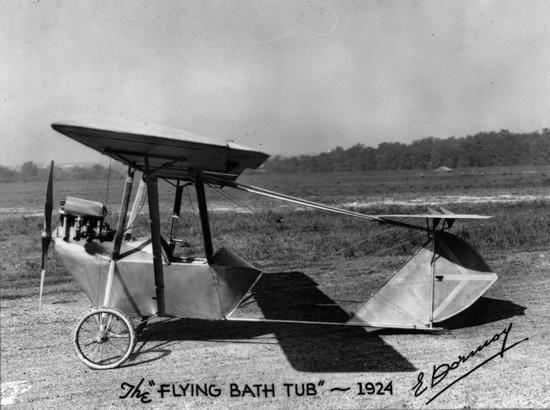

General information
- Type: Racing aircraft
- National origin: United States of America
- Designer: Etienne Dormoy

History
- First flight: 1924

The Dormoy Bathtub was a simple-to-construct, high wing racing aircraft of the 1920s.

== Design and development ==
The Bathtub was developed by Etienne Dormoy, a French engineer at McCook Field in Dayton, Ohio as a simple low-cost and ultra-light aircraft. Dormoy would later design the Buhl Bull Pup.

The aircraft used a steel tube fuselage, with an exposed tail section. The parasol wings used wood spars with fabric covering supported by steel lift struts. The ailerons used steel control cables that were exposed in front of the leading edge of the wing. The engine was a modified Henderson motorcycle engine purchased for $325.

== Operational history ==
The Dormoy Bathtub competed in the 1924 and 1925 National Air Races, winning the Rickenbacker Trophy in 1924. The 1925 model featured a fully covered tail section, removing its "bathtub" appearance.

An example of a 1924 Dormoy Bathtub fuselage with a Heath-Henderson engine is on display at the Motorcycle Heritage Museum in Westerville, Ohio. A large scale model of a 1924 Dormoy Bathtub is on display at the International Sport Aviation Museum in Florida.

== Variants ==
A homebuilt design was produced by Mike Kimbrel, the Kimbrel Dormoy Bathtub Mk 1, using a 40 hp (30 kW) Volkswagen air-cooled engine.

== Specifications (Dormoy Bathtub) ==
Data from EAA

General characteristics

- Length: 13 ft 5 in (4.09 m)
- Wingspan: 24 ft (7.3 m)
- Wing area: 85 sq ft (7.9 m^{2})
- Gross weight: 425 lb (193 kg)
- Fuel capacity: 2 US gallons (7.6 litres)
- Powerplant: 1 × Heath-Henderson B-4 , 20 hp (15 kW)

Performance

- Cruise speed: 61 kn (70 mph, 110 km/h)

== See also ==
Aircraft of comparable role, configuration, and era

- Heath Parasol
