= Buhl Airsedan =

1927 American single-engine sesquiplane cabin light transport aircraft

Airsedan
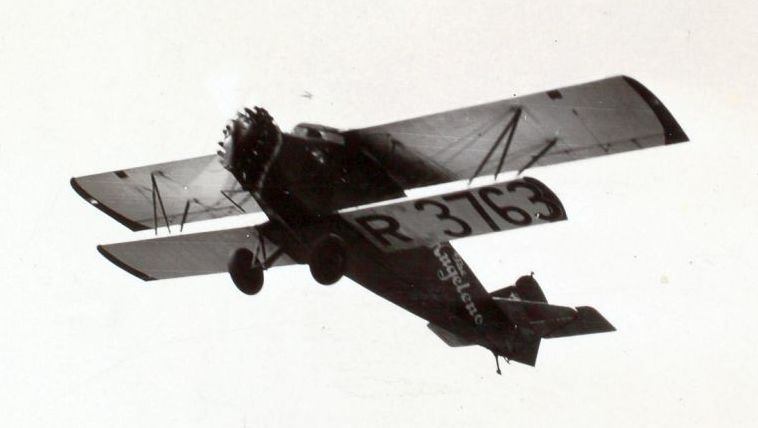
- CA-5 Air Sedan The Angeleno

General information
- Type: Civil utility aircraft
- National origin: United States
- Manufacturer: Buhl Aircraft Company
- Designer: Etienne Dormoy
- Status: Retired
- Primary users: Mamer Air Transport/Flying Service Ontario Provincial Air Service (OPAS); Servicio Aéreo Panini
- Number built: 62+ (20 x CA-3, 14 x CA-5, 23 x CA-6, 5 x CA-8)

History
- Manufactured: 1927-1937
- Introduction date: 1927
- First flight: 1927

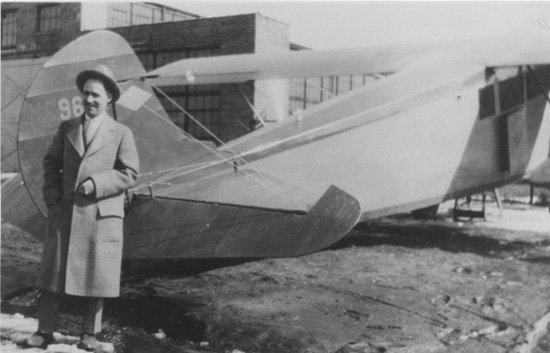
Etienne Dormoy with Buhl CA-8

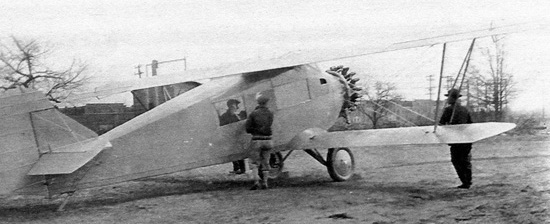
Unmarked CA-5 Airsedan prototype

The Buhl AirSedan was a family of American civil cabin sesquiplane aircraft developed and manufactured by the Buhl Aircraft Company in the late 1920s. One example completed the first transcontinental non-stop roundtrip flight, made in 1929 by the CA-6 Spokane Sun-God, and the first Pope to have flown did so in a Buhl Airsedan.

== Design and development ==
The Airsedan series were designed by Etienne Dormoy following the departure of Alfred V. Verville from Buhl, with whom he had worked previously. Dormoy had worked with Deperdussin before World War I, flew combat operations during the war before returning to work with SPAD, travelled to the US to coordinate production of SPADs with Curtiss until the project was cancelled with the end of the war. He then worked with Packard on automobiles for a year in 1919 before working as a civilian with the United States Army Air Corps with Verville, who convinced him to work at Buhl. As a Frenchman, he was familiar with the advantages of the sesquiplane concept as it was a popular configuration in France, such as with the Breguet 26T airliner, but rare in the US.

The fuselage framework, lower wing and empennage were welded chromium-molybdenum alloy steel tubes faired with wooden battens, with the lower wing integral with the fuselage structure. The upper wings were built around spruce spars, with built up ribs made from spruce and plywood. The entire airframe was covered with doped aircraft-grade fabric. To reduce control forces, projecting aerodynamic balance horns on rudder and elevators, while inset aerodynamic horns were used on the ailerons, which were fitted to the upper wing only. To provide trim control, the rudder was ground adjustable while the elevators could be adjustable in flight. Depending on the models, three different designs of lower wings were used - either constant chord with reversed N struts on the CA-5, a triangular wing with a vee strut on the CA-3, CA-6 and CA-8, or a constant chord wing with two rigged struts, on Canadian built CA-6Ms. All were conventional sesquiplanes with fully enclosed cockpits, fitted with dual controls in front of a passenger cabin. The number in the designation generally referred to the number of occupants as originally designed, with a larger number of seats corresponding to a larger airframe. The first variant built was the CA-5, while later variants had a much slimmer fuselage, a greatly improved windscreen design and a modified cockpit. The CA-5 had the undercarriage legs connected to the fuselage, and part way out from the fuselage, on the lower wing. The CA-3 had the undercarriage mounted solely to the fuselage, while the CA-6 and CA-8 had additional bracing struts from the top of the fuselage to the lower wing which allowed the undercarriage track to be widened. Buhl asserted that its undercarriage design reduced camber changes during landing, and the tendency to yaw due to bumpy ground. The CA-6 was certified to use Edo J-5300 floats.

=== Canadian production ===
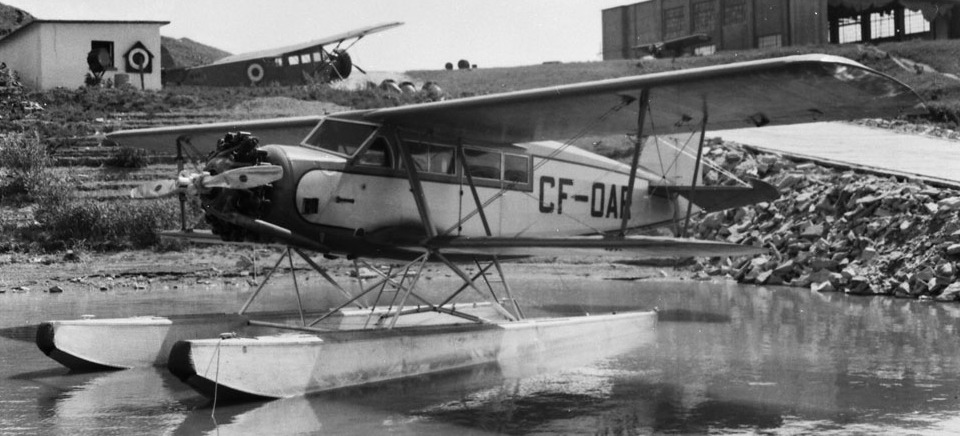
Canadian-built Buhl CA-6M Airsedan with enlarged lower wings.

After Buhl had ceased operations in 1932 due to declining sales as the Great Depression deepened, the drawings and jigs were purchased by the Ontario Provincial Air Service (OPAS) in Canada who then built four CA-6M's for use as fire spotting aircraft at their facility in Sault Ste. Marie between 1935 and 1937. These differed from the original aircraft in having Canadian Vickers floats, a new fin and rudder and larger lower wings. Due to the excessive weight of the Canadian-Vickers built floats, the first Ontario Provincial Air Service-built CA-6M refused to leave the water until given a more powerful 440 hp (330 kW) Pratt & Whitney Wasp engine.

== Operational history ==
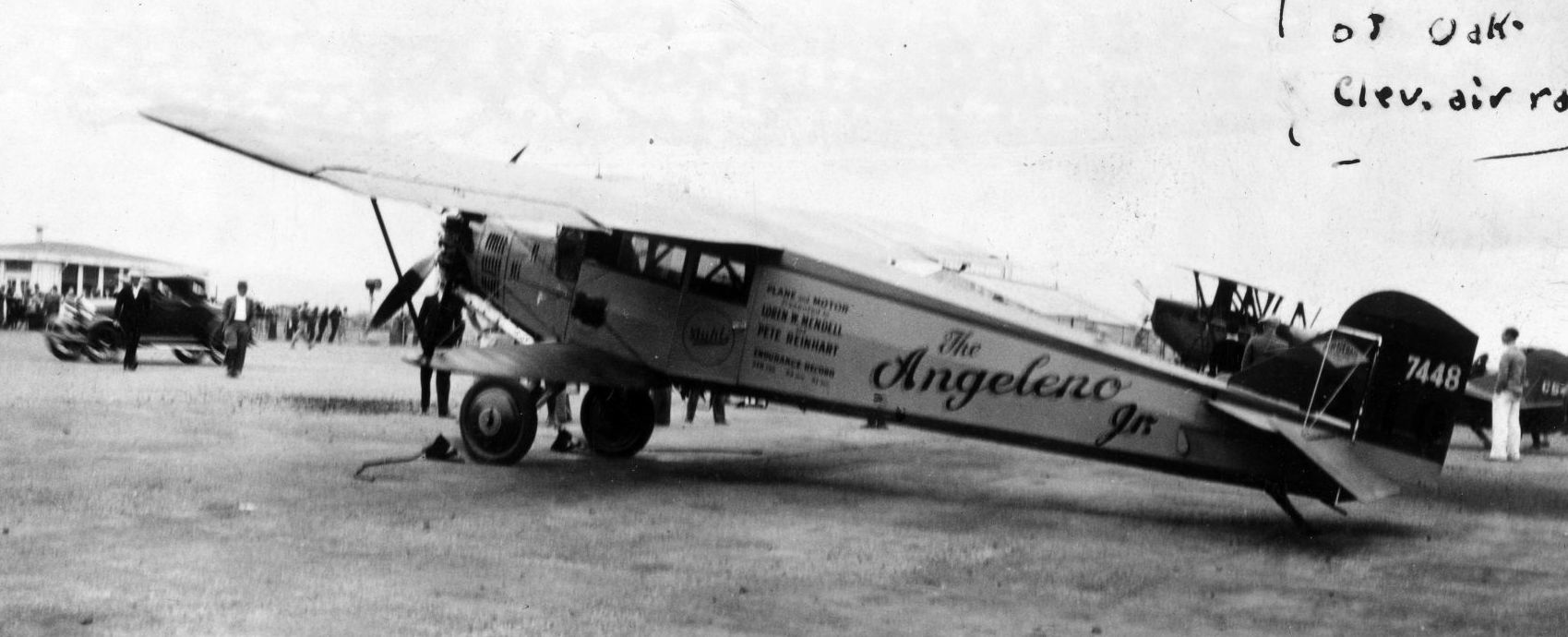
The Angelino Junior after winning the 1929 Oakland-Cleveland race

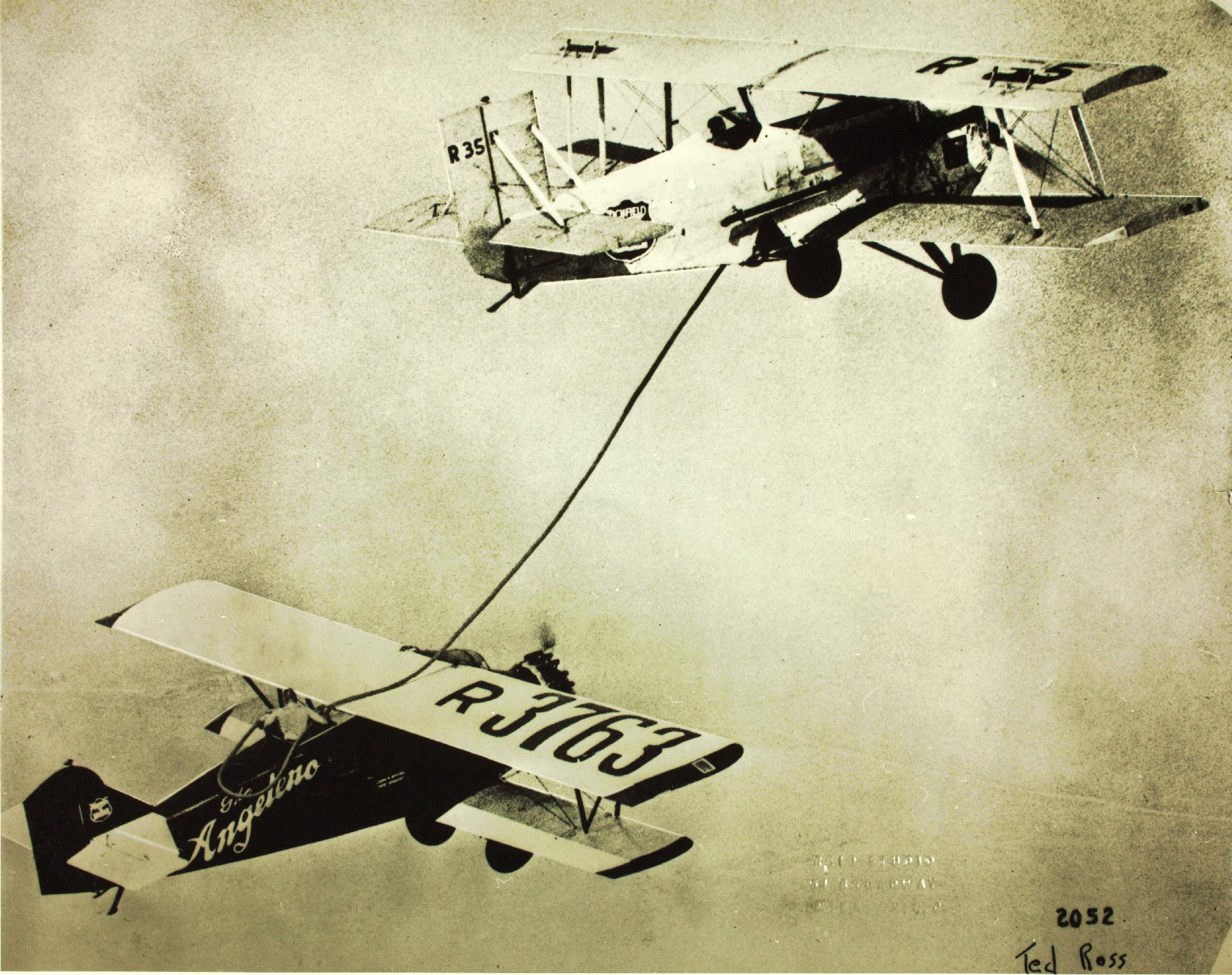
The Angeleno (L) being refueled in flight from a Curtiss Carrier Pigeon

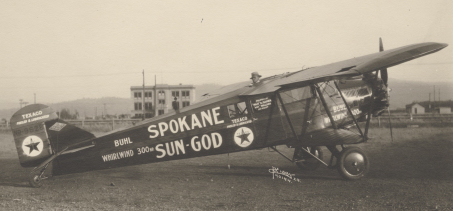
CA-6 Air Sedan Spokane Sun God after non-stop round trip crossing of the United States

A CA-5 Airsedan NC2915, dubbed Miss Doran, and flown by Auggie Pedlar with V. P. Knope navigating, was one of the entrants in the disastrous August 1927 Dole Air Race and like many competitors, was lost at sea. Two other aviators lost their lives in a Swallow monoplane while searching for them.

A CA-3C Sport Airsedan NC7448, named Angelino Jr was piloted by Loren Mendell to first place in the Oakland-Cleveland Air Derby during the 1929 National Air Races.

The Angeleno, CA-5A NR3763, also flown by Loren Mendell, along with R.B. Reinhart, set an endurance record of 246 hours, 43 minutes and 2 seconds on July 12, 1929, using inflight refuelling. They had just barely beaten the previous record when trash tossed from the aircraft jammed the tail and ended their run - and worse, their record would be bested within two weeks with a Curtiss Robin.

Another Airsedan, a CA-6 Special NC9628 named Spokane Sun God made the first nonstop round-trip crossing the United States by air. Nick Mamer and Art Walker flew from Spokane, Washington, to New York City and back beginning on August 15, 1929, taking 120 hours (five days) for the trip, using inflight refueling. They covered 7,200 miles (11,600 km) and made eleven fuel transfers. That was not Mamer's only connection to the Airsedans, as his airlines operated five examples in addition to the record breaking aircraft.

After having served as a technology demonstrator for Packard, the Packard DR-980 Diesel powered CA-3E NC8451 was re-engined with a Wright J-6 Whirlwind and exported to Argentina for use by Aeroposta Argentina in 1931. In 1934 it made a flight over Buenos Aires with Cardinal Monsignor Pacelli, shortly before he was elected as Pope Pius XII, becoming the first Pope to have made a flight in an aircraft.

After a career spent seeking out forest fires in the northern Ontario bush, as an airborne counterpart to fire lookout towers, the last of the Ontario Provincial Air Service CA-6Ms would be sold off to private operators in 1948. Their service predated the use of aircraft for directly extinguishing fires, so after spotting a fire, the Buhls would transport firemen to the fire, equipped with portable firefighting equipment, supplanting or replacing earlier types of aircraft such as the Curtiss HS-2L and Canadian Vickers Vedette. If this sounds laborious, aircraft replaced the canoes which had been used previously.

After passing through a number of owners and undergoing unspecified modifications ostensibly for movie photography, CA-6 NC9629 was seized on 9 May 1933 while smuggling 170 US gal (660 L) of alcohol from Mexico during Prohibition near Fallbrook, California, by the American Immigration and Naturalization Service while the alcohol was being transferred to a waiting Marmon coupe. Prohibition would end later that same year.

Lineas Aereas del Balsas imported one CA-6 which was based out of Morelia for a route running between Manzanillo and Mexico City, while Carlos Panini eventually imported four CA-6s into Mexico for his much more successful airline. Carlos was a recent immigrant from Italy, and having taken flying lessons, started an airline in 1934, running the Ruta del Balsas (Balsas Route), along the Balsas River (sometimes known as the Atoyac River), in Mexico. The river lacked any bridges for over 300 miles, and communities usually travelled back and forth by boat, however, during the flood season, this became extremely hazardous. Beginning in September 1936, he initiated what may be the shortest commercial airline route, between Ciudad Altamirano to Coyuca de Catalán, a distance of about 1 km (0.62 mi), which he covered in a mere two minutes of flight time, and for which he charged 8 pesos per person. This was sufficiently successful that he bought three additional Buhls, and eventually expanded into a major airline.

During the 1929 Escobar Rebellion when the Mexican government faced a large scale mutiny led by General José Gonzalo Escobar against the office of President going to a civilian, one of these Buhls was operated by the Fuerza Aérea Mexicana as a light utility transport with standard military red-white-green triangle markings. It is likely the sole example to have seen military service.

== Variants ==
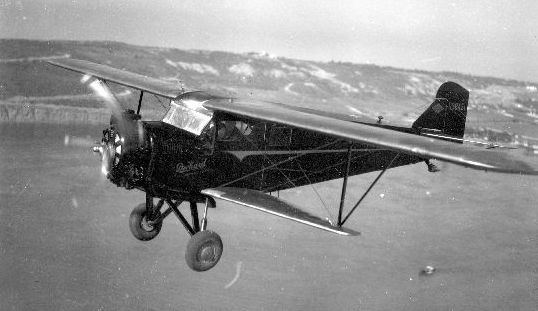
Packard DR-980 demonstrator CA-3E NC8451 in flight

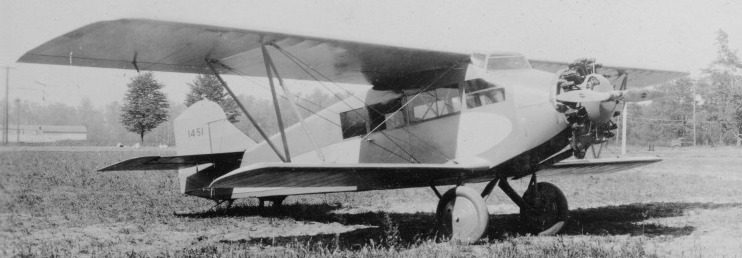
CA-5A N1451 was operated by Mamer Flying Service

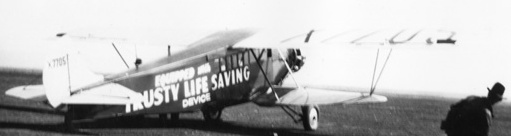
Buhl CA-8 Senior Airsedan with airliner seat parachute advertising

- CA-3 Airsedan (1928) - 36 ft 0 in (10.97 m) wing span three-seater powered by a 225 hp (168 kW) Wright J-5 Whirlwind radial
  - CA-3A - conversion of CA-3
  - CA-3B Junior Airsedan - 110 hp (82 kW) Warner Scarab
  - CA-3C Sport Airsedan (ATC 46) - 225 hp (168 kW) Wright J-5 Whirlwind
    - CA-3CW Sport Airsedan (ATC 2-328) - 300 hp (220 kW) Pratt & Whitney Wasp
  - CA-3D Sport Airsedan (ATC 163, 2-72) - 300 hp (220 kW) Wright J-6 Whirlwind
  - CA-3E Sport Airsedan (ATC 2-309) - 225 hp (168 kW) Packard DR-980
- CA-5 Airsedan (1927, ATC 12) - 42 ft 0 in (12.80 m) wing span five-seater powered by a 225 hp (168 kW) Wright J-5 Whirlwind
  - CA-5A Airsedan (ATC 33) - Deluxe version powered with a 225 hp (168 kW) Wright J-5 Whirlwind
- CA-6 Standard Airsedan (1929, ATC 128, 2-51) - 40 ft 0 in (12.19 m) wing span six-seater powered by a 300 hp (220 kW) Wright J-6 Whirlwind
  - CA-6 Special - 300 hp (220 kW) Wright J-6 Whirlwind Spokane Sun God endurance aircraft
  - CA-6A Airsedan - 420 hp (310 kW) Pratt & Whitney Wasp
  - CA-6B Airsedan (ATC 2-225) - 450 hp (340 kW) Pratt & Whitney Wasp
  - CA-6D Special - 2 converted from CA-3D as six seaters
  - CA-6J Airsedan (ATC 2-336) - 300 hp (220 kW) Pratt & Whitney Wasp five seater (1 converted from CA-6)
  - CA-6M Airsedan - 440 hp (330 kW) Pratt & Whitney Wasp powered Canadian-built CA-6 with local modifications. 4 built.
  - CA-6W Airsedan (ATC 2-133) - 420 hp (310 kW) Pratt & Whitney Wasp four seater (1 converted from CA-6)
- CA-8 Senior Airsedan (1929 ATC 2-46) - 48 ft 0 in (14.63 m) wing span eight-seater powered by a 450 hp (340 kW) Pratt & Whitney Wasp C
  - CA-8A Senior Airsedan (ATC 98) - 525 hp (391 kW) Wright R-1750 Cyclone 9
  - CA-8B Senior Airsedan (ATC 99) - 525 hp (391 kW) Pratt & Whitney R-1690 Hornet

== Operators ==
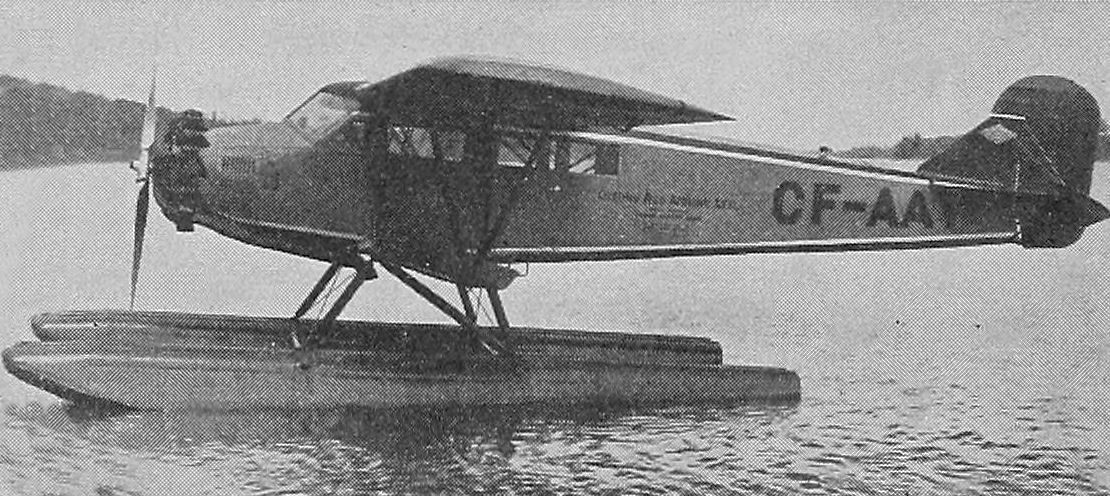
CA-6 CF-AAY operated by Cherry Red Airline

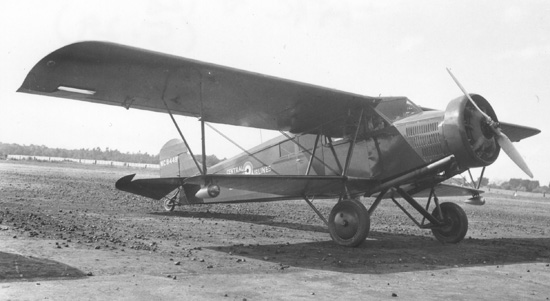
CA-6B NC8449 operated by Central Airlines

Argentina

- Aeroposta Argentina - operated one CA-3D

Canada

- Brooks Construction & Transportation/Brooks Airways - operated two CA-6s
- Cherry Red Airline - operated one CA-6
- National Air Transport - operated one CA-3C, one CA-5, and one CA-6
- Ontario Provincial Air Service (OPAS) - operated four CA-6Ms

Mexico

- Lineas Aereas del Balsas operated one CA-6
- Servicio Aéreo Panini operated four CA-6s
- Fuerza Aérea Mexicana operated one CA-6 during the 1929 Escobar Rebellion

United States

- Central Airlines operated a CA-6B
- Nick Mamer/Mamer Air Transport/Mamer Flying Service - operated one CA-3A, one CA-5A, three CA-6Bs and the CA-6 distance record aircraft
- Various private operators.

== Survivors and aircraft on display ==
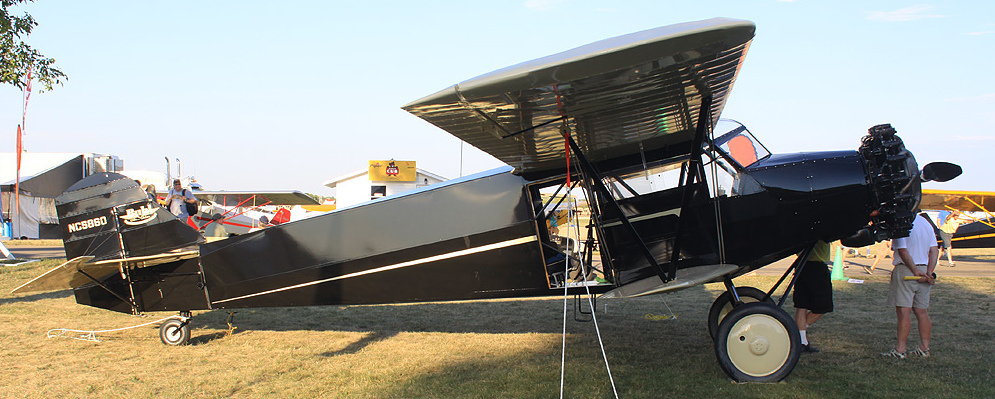
First CA-3 built, NC5860 in 2012

- NC5860: The first CA-3C was built in June 1928, and was raced in the 1928 National Air Tour with Buhl markings. It underwent a major restoration that was completed in 2011.
- NC5861: The prototype CA-3, having been converted to a CA-3C, was bought back by the Buhl family in 2007 and restored to flying condition in 2012.
- NC8451: A Packard DR-980 diesel powered CA-3 currently owned by the Golden Wings Museum in Blaine, Minnesota, after having been restored from derelict condition as found in Argentina. This was the aircraft in which the first flight made by a Pope, Pius XII. Although painted as it was when it was a CA-3E, it is fitted with the Wright J-6 engine which it had when it was a CA-3D.
- CF-OAR and CF-OAT: The unrestored remains from two OPAS Buhl CA-6Ms are on display as found, at the Canadian Bushplane Heritage Centre in Sault Ste. Marie, Ontario.

== Specifications (CA-6 ATC# 128) ==
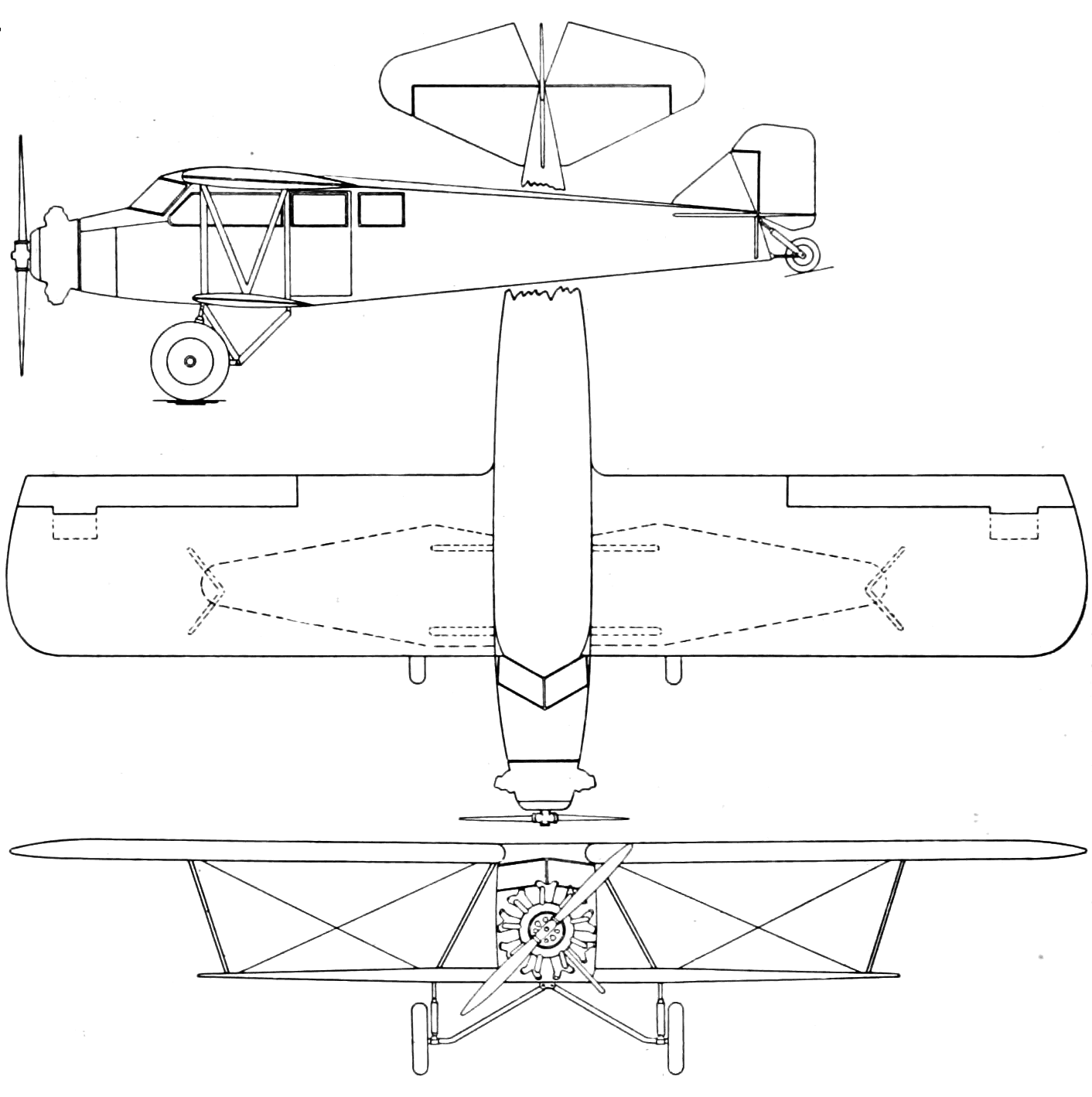
Buhl CA-6 Airsedan 3-view drawing

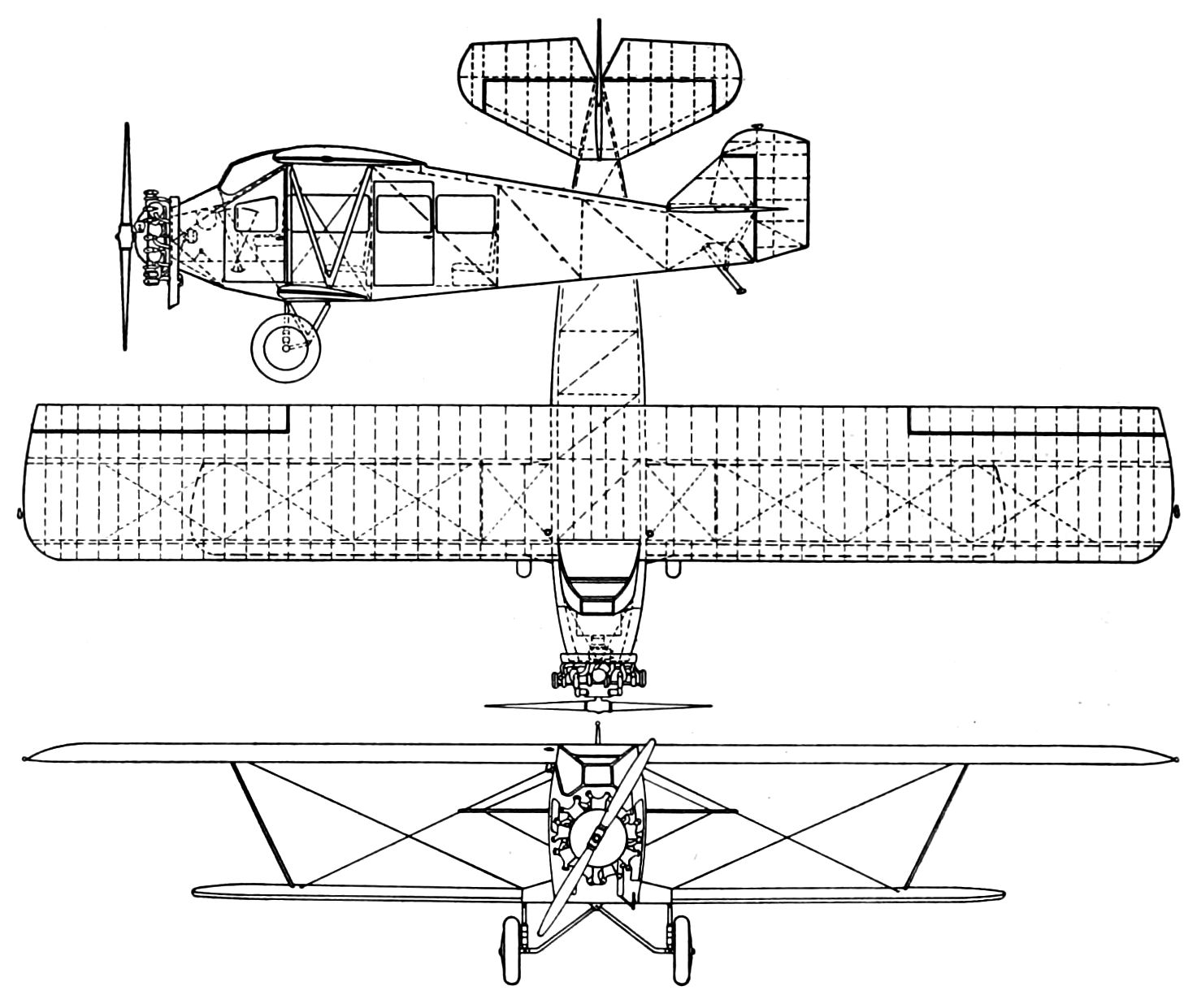
Buhl CA-5 Airsedan 3-view drawing

Data from Juptner, 1964, p.82

General characteristics

- Crew: One (pilot)
- Capacity: Five
- Length: 29 ft 8 in (9.04 m)
- Upper wingspan: 40 ft 0 in (12.19 m)
- Upper wing chord: 81 in (2.06 m)
- Lower wingspan: 26 ft 1 in (7.95 m)
- Lower wing chord: 46 in (1.17 m) mean - tapered
- Height: 8 ft 7 in (2.62 m)
- Wing area: 315 sq ft (29.3 m^{2}) combined upper and lower
- Upper wing area: 239 sq ft (22.2 m^{2})
- Lower wing area: 76 sq ft (7.1 m^{2})
- Undercarriage track: 9 ft 6 in (2.90 m)
- Airfoil: Clark Y
- Empty weight: 2,478 lb (1,124 kg)
- Gross weight: 4,200 lb (1,905 kg)
- Fuel capacity: 100 US gal (380 L; 83 imp gal)
- Oil Capacity: 8 US gal (30 L; 6.7 imp gal)
- Powerplant: 1 × Wright J-6-9 Whirlwind Air cooled 9 cylinder radial engine, 300 hp (220 kW)
- Propellers: 2-bladed metal Hamilton Standard propeller

Performance

- Maximum speed: 140 mph (230 km/h, 120 kn)
- Cruise speed: 120 mph (190 km/h, 100 kn)
- Minimum control speed: 45 mph (72 km/h, 39 kn)
- Range: 720 mi (1,160 km, 630 nmi)
- Service ceiling: 17,000 ft (5,200 m)
- Rate of climb: 900 ft/min (4.6 m/s) in first minute

== See also ==
- 1927 in aviation
- Buhl CA-1 Airster
- Buhl Bull Pup
- Bush plane
- Aerial firefighting

Aircraft of comparable role, configuration, and era

- Bellanca CH-300 Pacemaker
- Bréguet 26T
- Cunningham-Hall PT-6
- Solar MS-1
- Stearman CAB-1 Coach

Related lists

- List of civil aircraft
