= Nick Mamer =

American aviator (1897-1938)

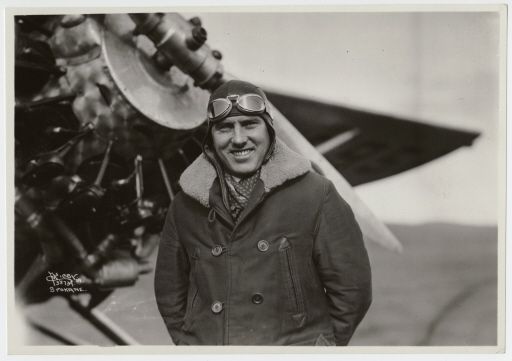
- Mamer in March 1929
- Born: Nicholas Bernard Mamer c. 1897
- Died: January 10, 1938 (age 40); Gallatin County, Montana, U.S.
- Cause of death: Plane crash, Northwest Flight 2
- Resting place: Evergreen Washelli Memorial Park; Seattle, Washington
- Occupation: Aviator
- Spouse(s): Faye C. Carey Mamer (1901–1958) (m.1925–1938, his death)
- Children: Patricia Ann Mamer Lee (1927–1995)
- Military career
- Allegiance: United States
- Branch: U.S. Army
- Service years: 1917–1919
- Units: Signal Corp, Aviation Section
- Conflicts: World War I

Nicholas Bernard Mamer (1897 – January 10, 1938) was a noted American aviation pioneer and pilot in the Pacific Northwest during the 1920s and 1930s.

== Early career ==
Mamer learned to fly in San Diego and served with the Aviation Section, U.S. Signal Corps of the United States Army during World War I. He later settled in Spokane, Washington, establishing the Mamer Flying Service and Mamer Air Transport firms at Parkwater airstrip, renamed Felts Field in 1927. Mamer was a flight instructor and charter pilot, and was involved in early forest fire patrol flights for the U.S. Forest Service. Among his flight pupils was Bob Johnson, a well-known aviation pioneer in Missoula, Montana.

== Spokane Sun-God ==
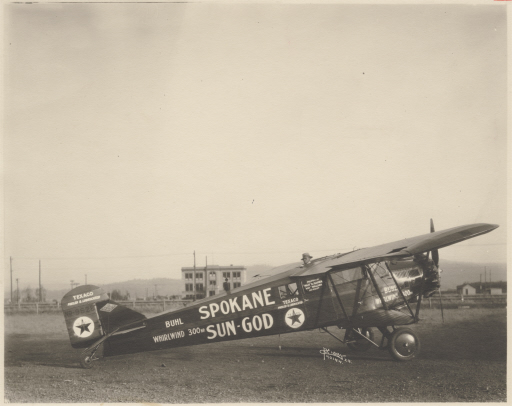
Spokane Sun-God at Felts Field in 1929

Mamer is perhaps best remembered for undertaking a pioneering long-distance endurance flight in 1929 that began on August 15. The flight utilized a Buhl Airsedan biplane named the Spokane Sun-God; Mamer was at the controls, and was accompanied by Art Walker acting as mechanic and refueling hoseman.

Beginning in Spokane, Mamer and Walker flew south to San Francisco, east to New York City, and back to Spokane five days later, without intermediate stops. Aerial refueling was accomplished at a number of points along the flight path (one was over Missoula on the return trip). Mamer and Walker did not sleep during those five days (120 hours) aloft. They set a number of records, one of which was a world's record non-stop flight of 7,200 miles (11,600 km).

== Death ==
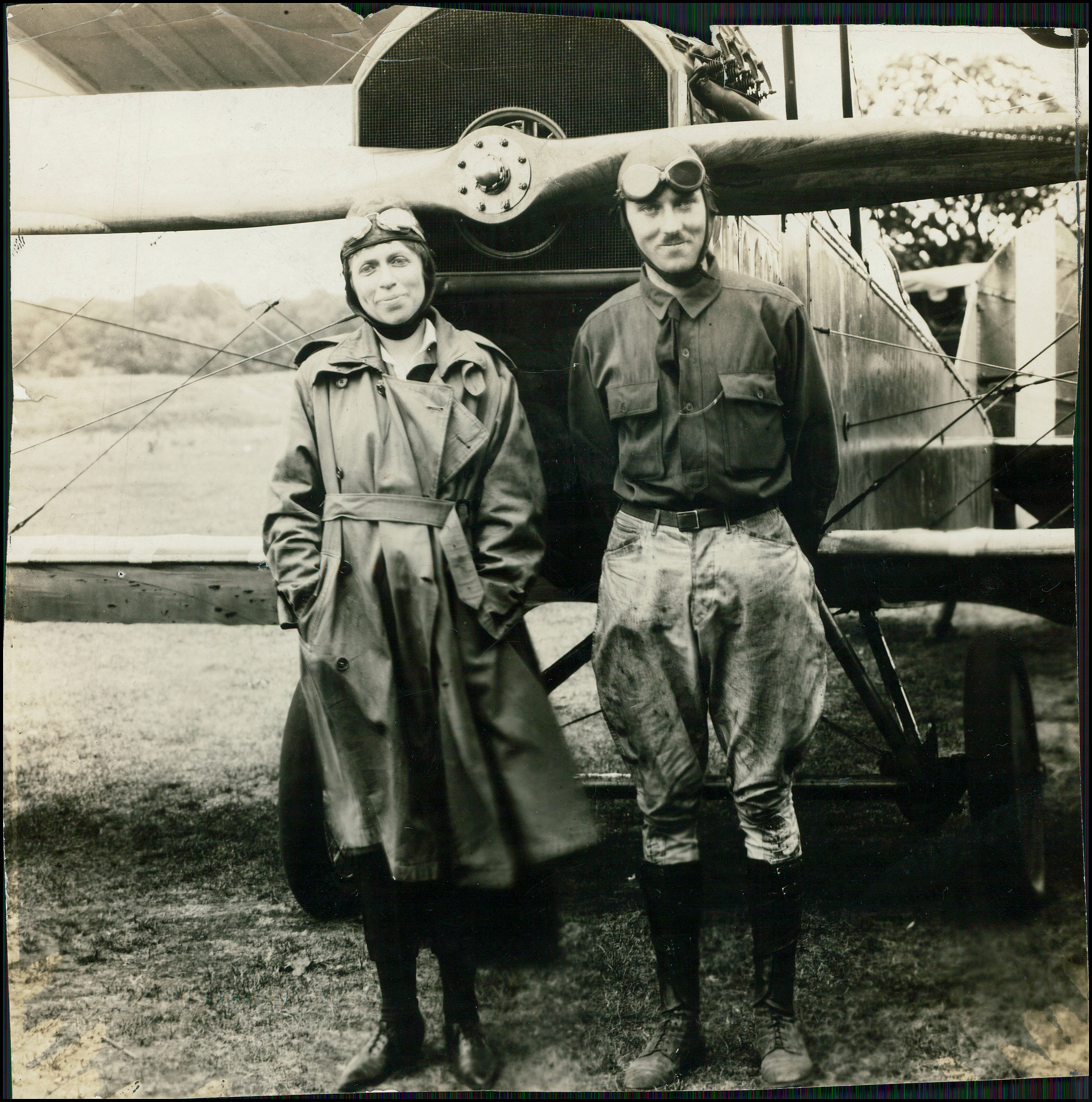
Mamer with Marguerite Guthrie, sister of Murray Kenneth Guthrie

By the late 1930s, Mamer had flown over a million miles (1.6 million km) and had relocated to Seattle; he was employed by Northwest Airlines, working as a pilot on the Seattle-Minneapolis route. In early 1938, he was at the controls of Flight 2, a Lockheed Super Electra, when the plane crashed in Montana on the afternoon of January 10.

Parts of the tail section were torn from the aircraft as it flew over the Bridger Range, in Gallatin County northeast of Bozeman, and the plane went into a dive and crashed. Mamer, co-pilot Fred West, and eight passengers died instantly, and a fire ensued. Later, an investigation revealed that the tail structure had failed on the new design from what is known as "natural resonance, or period of vibration". It was the first fatal accident for the Super Electra and Northwest Airlines.

== See also ==
- Northwest Airlines Flight 2
