= Panis =

Panis may refer to:

- Aurélien Panis (born 1994), French racing driver
- Jacqueline Panis (born 1948), French politician
- Jürgen Panis (born 1975), Austrian footballer
- Olivier Panis (born 1966), French racing driver
- Panis (slaves), term for enslaved indigenous peoples in New France
- Panis (Rigvedic tribe), a Vedic tribe
- Panis, legendary creatures in Hindu mythology
- Panis, an extinct bivalve in the family Bakevelliidae

== See also ==
- Penis (disambiguation)
- Pani (disambiguation)
