= Cherry Red Airline =

Airline in Saskatchewan, Canada

Cherry Red Airline Limited
- Commenced operations: 1928
- Ceased operations: 1932
- Operating bases: North Battleford from 1930
- Fleet size: 2
- Destinations: Various mines and rural destinations in Saskatchewan

Cherry Red Airline, also known as the Cherry Air Service, was the first airline in Prince Albert, Saskatchewan.

== History ==
It was founded by Norman Cherry and H. Holroyde in 1928. Cherry noticed an unmet demand for transportation services by mines in Saskatchewan, especially Consolidated Mining and Smelting, and decided to create an airline to meet that need. He hired pilot Alva Malone and partnered with H. Holroyde. The airline had a fleet consisting of two airplanes: a two-seat Pheasant biplane and a six-seat Buhl CA-6 Airsedan (CF-AAY). To earn extra revenue, Cherry decided to issue stamps starting at $0.10 for carrying airmail, making the airline the first airmail provider in Prince Albert. Existing stamps issued by the company are sought after by collectors. The Great Depression brought about the end of the airline as mine traffic dried up. by 1932, the company had failed. The Buhl Airsedan had previously been lost in an accident with no fatalities. The Pheasant biplane was sold and, in 1932, it crash landed, rendering it inoperable. The plane languished in storage until the Moose Jaw branch of the Western Development Museum acquired it in 1950. Volunteers worked from 1960 to 1964 to restore it, and it has been in the museum's permanent collection ever since. It is the oldest surviving airplane in Saskatchewan.

== See also ==
- List of defunct airlines of Canada
