= Pani (surname) =

Pani is an Indian surname, see that article for notable people with this surname of Indian origin.

Notable people with surname Pani of other origins include:

- Alberto J. Pani, Mexican civil engineer, politician, and expert in economic policy
- Claudio Pani, Italian former football midfielder
- Corrado Pani, Italian actor and voice actor
- Jack Pani, French long jumper
- Lorenzo Pani, Italian rugby union player
- Mario Pani, Mexican architect and urbanist
- Mario Pani (sport shooter), Mexican former sports shooter
- Massimiliano Pani, Italian songwriter, producer and composer
- Nicole Pani, former French athlete
- Sandra Pani, Mexican artist
