= Buhl Bull Pup =

Bull Pup
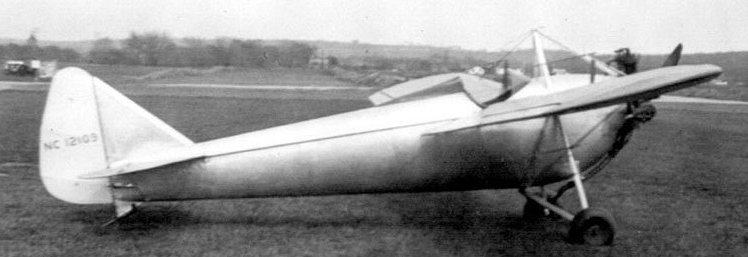

General information
- Type: Sportsplane
- Manufacturer: Buhl
- Designer: Étienne Dormoy
- Number built: ca. 100

History
- First flight: 1930

The Buhl LA-1 Bull Pup was a light sports airplane developed in the United States in 1930. It was a mid-wing wire-braced monoplane with fixed tailskid undercarriage and an open cockpit for the pilot. Buhl developed the Bull Pup as a cheap aircraft through which the company hoped to remain in business as the onset of the Great Depression was felt. However, as the economic situation worsened, it became evident that there was no demand for even such a basic aircraft; when production ceased in 1932, all aircraft still in stock were sold off at half price as the company folded.

== Variants ==
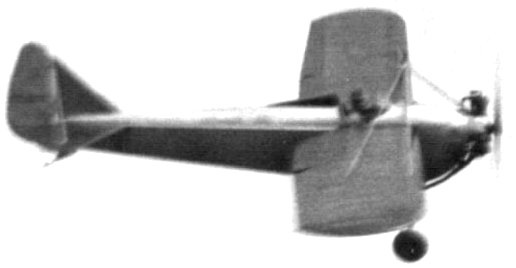
Bull Pup c.1936

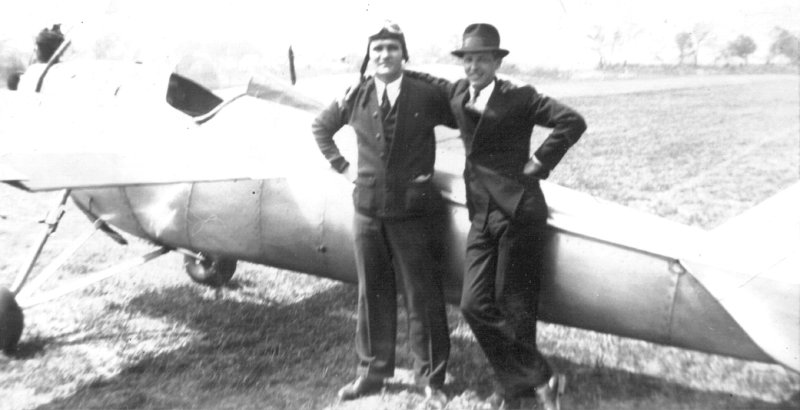
Ted Lowe and Joe Palwicki with a Bull Pup, May 1936

- LA-1 Bull Pup
- LA-1A Bull Pup – version for competition flying with 28 ft wingspan
- LA-1B Bull Pup – version for high-altitude flying with 32 ft wingspan
- LA-1S Bull Pup – floatplane version

== Specifications (L-1) ==
Data from Aviation

General characteristics

- Crew: 1
- Length: 19 ft 0 in (5.79 m)
- Wingspan: 30 ft 0 in (9.14 m)
- Height: 6 ft 6 in (1.98 m)
- Wing area: 109.4 sq ft (10.16 m^{2})
- Empty weight: 550 lb (249 kg)
- Gross weight: 850 lb (386 kg)
- Fuel capacity: 10 US gal (8.3 imp gal; 38 L)
- Powerplant: 1 × Szekely SR-3 three-cylinder radial engine, 45 hp (34 kW)

Performance

- Maximum speed: 98 mph (158 km/h, 85 kn)
- Cruise speed: 78 mph (126 km/h, 68 kn)
- Range: 260 mi (420 km, 230 nmi)
- Service ceiling: 14,000 ft (4,300 m)
- Rate of climb: 780 ft/min (4.0 m/s)

== See also ==
- Buhl CA-1 Airster; Buhl Airsedan
