= Harold D. Kantner =

American pioneer aviator

Harold Dewolf Kantner
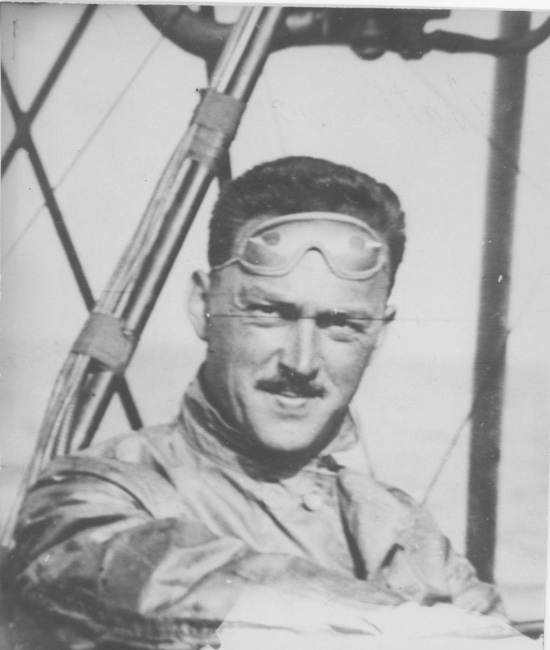
- Born: 23 February 1886; Meadville, Pennsylvania
- Died: 11 December 1973 (aged 87)
- Spouse: Mildred McCoy
- Children: Richard D Kantner

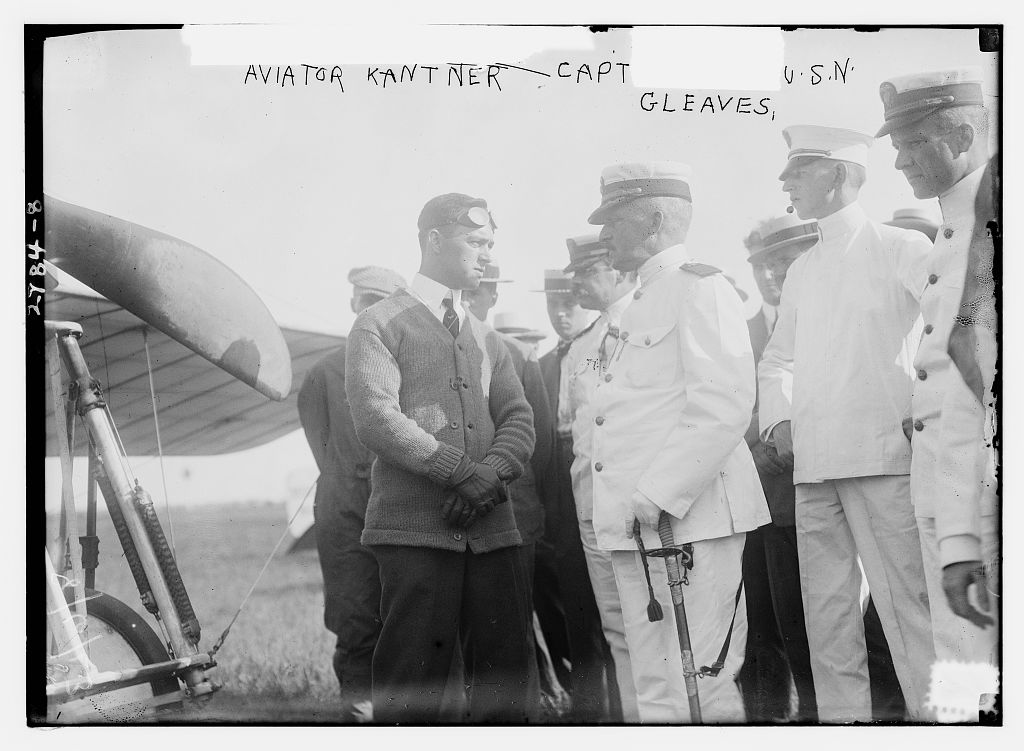
Kantner and Albert Gleaves circa 1910-1913

Harold Dewolf Kantner (February 23, 1886 – December 11, 1973) was a pioneer aviator.

== Biography ==
He was born on February 23, 1886, in Meadville, Pennsylvania. He attended the John Bevins Moisant aviation school and was taught to fly by Andre Haupert. Kantner and Etienne Dormoy built a Bleriot monoplane with a 50 horsepower Gnome et Rhône engine in which Kantner soloed on June 30, 1911, and was given Fédération Aéronautique Internationale certificate number 65 on October 14, 1911, in Mineola, New York. He was instructor at the Yale group in Buffalo, New York. After World War I he worked as designer and test pilot for Continental motors, Aeromarine, Fairchild and Convair. He retired from Convair in 1961. He died on December 11, 1973.
