= Buhl Airster =

Buhl Airster may refer to either of two aircraft designed by the same manufacturer but otherwise unrelated:

- Buhl-Verville CA-3 Airster, utility biplane of 1925
- Buhl CA-1 Airster, sports monoplane of 1930
