= Buhl Aircraft Company =

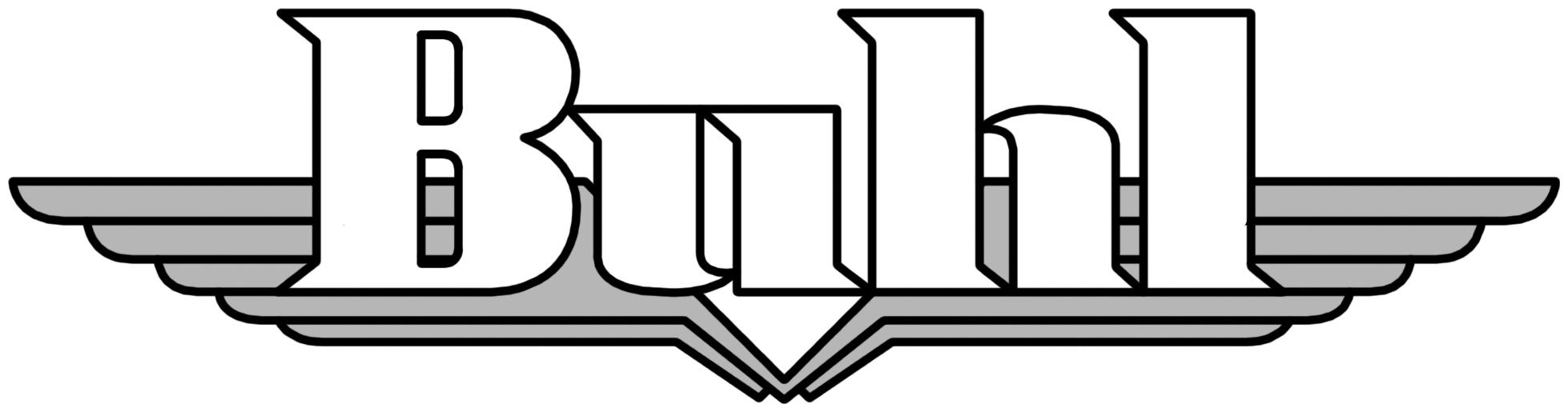
- Company type: Private
- Industry: Aerospace
- Founded: 1925; 100 years ago in Detroit-Marysville, Michigan, United States
- Founder: Buhl family of Detroit
- Defunct: July 21, 1932
- Headquarters: Detroit, Michigan, United States
- Key people: Etienne Dormoy; Alfred V. Verville

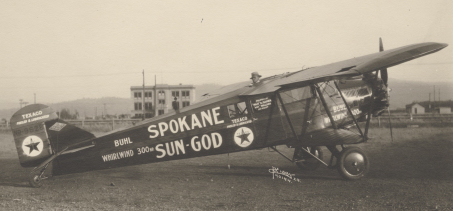
CA-6 Airsedan Spokane Sun God

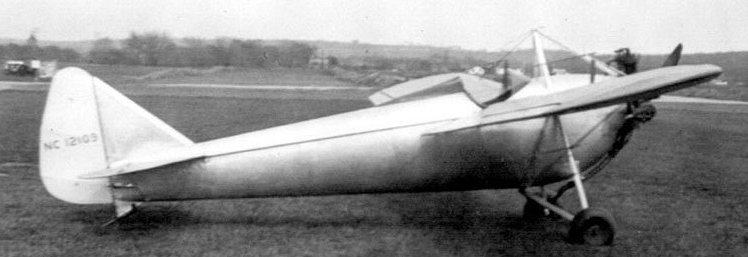
LA-1 Bull Pup single seat monoplane

The Buhl Aircraft Company was a US aircraft manufacturer founded in Detroit in 1925 which remained in operation until 1933. Buhl designed and manufactured the Buhl-Verville CA-3 Airster, the first aircraft to receive a US civil aviation type Certificate in March 1927. Several utility and sport aircraft models were developed from 1925 to 1931, both fixed wings and rotary wing aircraft. Their greatest successes were with the Airsedan and Bull Pup, with approximately 185 aircraft of all types built from 1925 to 1932.

== History ==
The Buhl Aircraft Company was founded in 1925 by the Buhl family of Detroit. Lawrence D. Buhl hired Etienne Dormoy and Alfred Verville who had previously been employed as engineers by the United States Army Air Service Engineering Division at McCook Field in Dayton, Ohio. Then, in 1926, the company purchased the former Illinois Tool Company factory and converted it for aircraft production.

The first aircraft to receive an Approved Type Certificate in the United States was the Buhl CA-3 Airster biplane which received Certificate #1 in March 1927. This was a commercial three seat open cockpit biplane suitable for carrying a couple of passengers, training student pilots and carrying light cargo. Other jobs such as crop dusting and aerial photography would be added later. Alfred Verville was the chief designer from the company's founding in 1925 until 1927, during the period when the CA-3 Airster was developed and certified. 20 would ultimately be built.

Etienne Dormoy replaced him, and was responsible for developing the Airsedan sesquiplane family, as well as the CA-1 Airster and Bull Pup monoplanes. Roughly 85 Airsedans in two basic designs (the CA-5, and much more refined CA-3, 6 and 8) were built which won a number of speed and endurance records and placed in the top in the Ford National Reliability Air Tour, the National Air Races. The Airsedan "Spokane Sun-God" was the first aircraft to make a non-stop US transcontinental round-trip flight on 15 August 1929. Sales would be hindered by the deepening Great Depression although over 100 of the tiny single-seat Bull Pup monoplanes were manufactured between 1930 and 1932.

Dormoy also designed the Buhl A-1 autogyro in 1930, optimized for aerial photography, with a pusher engine located behind the pilot and room for a camera operator up front. Only one of these was built.

In March 1931, Buhl Aircraft licensed from the Autogiro Company of America, Juan de la Cierva's and Harold Pitcairn's rotary-wing patents.

Following a request by six leading stockholders, the company was dissolved on 21 July 1932.

== Aircraft ==
All models are retired. Other than for the autogyro, the number in the designation refers to the number of seats as originally designed.

Type	Date	Number	Role	Class	Notes
CA-3 Airster	1926	20	utility	biplane	
CA-5 Airsedan	1927	14	cabin	sesquiplane	
CA-3 Junior/Sport Airsedan	1928	20	cabin	sesquiplane	
CA-6 Airsedan	1929	23	cabin	sesquiplane	
CA-8 Senior Airsedan	1929	5	cabin	sesquiplane	
CA-1/CW-1 Airster	1930	2	sport	monoplane	
LA-1 Bull Pup	1930	~100	sport	monoplane	
A-1 Autogyro	1931	1	photography	autogyro	
