= Buhl A-1 Autogiro =

A-1 Autogiro
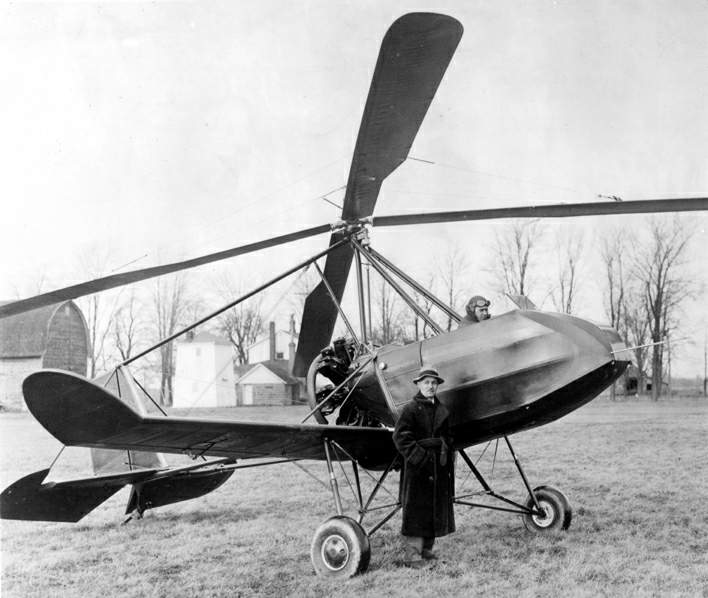
- Pilot James Johnson and Etienne Dormoy in front of the Buhl A-1 autogyro

General information
- Type: Camera observation aircraft
- Manufacturer: Buhl Aircraft Company
- Designer: Etienne Dormoy
- Number built: 1

History
- Introduction date: 1931
- First flight: 15 December 1931

The Buhl A-1 Autogiro was an autogyro optimised for air camera work designed and built from 1930. To this end, Etienne Dormoy designed the Buhl A-1, an autogyro with a pusher engine located behind the pilot and camera operator. The Buhl A-1 was the first pusher style autogyro. It is now on display at the Hiller Aviation Museum in San Carlos, California.

== Specifications ==
Data from Aerofiles Buhl

General characteristics

- Crew: 2
- Length: 27 ft (8.2 m)
- Wingspan: 32 ft (9.8 m)
- Diameter: 40 ft (12 m)
- Powerplant: 1 × Continental A70 7-cyl. air-cooled radial piston engine, 165 hp (123 kW)

Performance

== See also ==
Aircraft of comparable role, configuration, and era

- Cierva C.19
- Kellett K-2
- Kellett KD-1
- Pitcairn PCA-2
- Pitcairn PA-18
