= Panini Tapobhumi =

Hindu temple in Nepal

Religion
- Affiliation: Hinduism
- District: Arghakhanchi
- Province: Lumbini Province

Location
- Location: Panena of Arghakhanchi District
- Country: Nepal

Pānini Tapobhumi (Nepali: पाणिनि तपोभुमि) is a Hindu temple site located on the high hill of Panena village in the Arghakhanchi district of Lumbini province, in Nepal. This religious place derives its name from sage Pānini, a Sanskrit philologist, grammarian, and revered scholar in ancient India, and is known as a locale where he performed penance.

According to legend, Pānini came to Panena where he performed penance and authored his work Ashtadhyayi, a treatise on Sanskrit grammar.

Panini Tapobhumi houses many temples and archaeological sites and is believed to be an interesting tourist destination.

== History ==
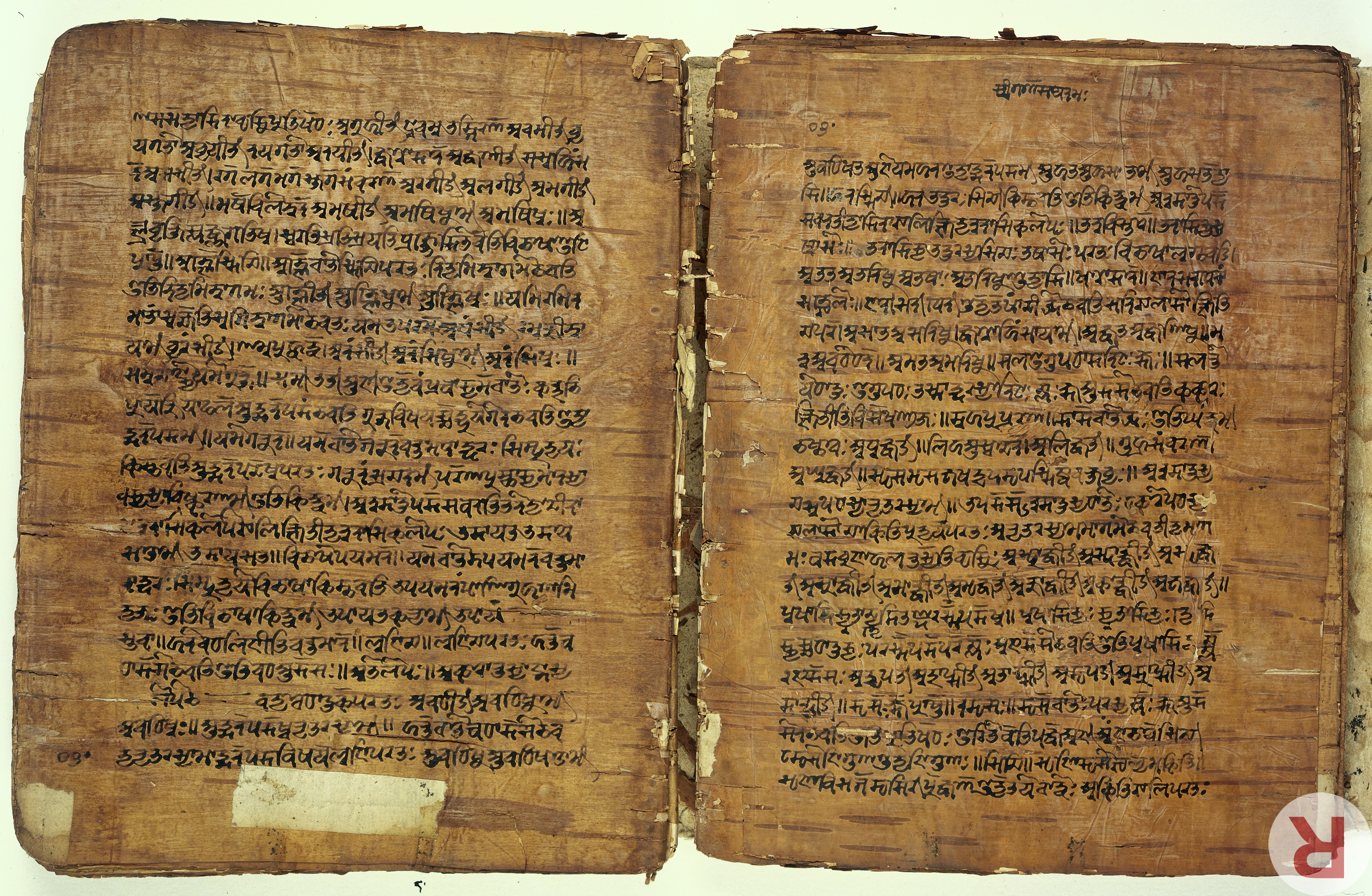
A 17th-century birch bark manuscript of Pāṇini's grammar treatise from Kashmir

Legend holds that Pānini was born in Shalatur, the son of a wealthy father. He was not diligent in his studies and was often critiqued by his classmates. His parents sent him to his maternal uncle's home in Pataliputra (Patna) and later he began learning at Takshashila University.

It is believed that he came to Panena, a small village in Arghakhanchi district of Lumbini province in search of performing penance. Lord Shiva was impressed by Pānini's devotion and austerity and he played the drums and uttered fourteen sutras such as Aiun, and Rilruk. He gave the 14 sutras as blessing to the sage Pānini, which he used to write the Sanskrit Grammar treatise called Aṣṭādhyāyī.

While at Takshasila University, Pānini lost an exam result against his friend Katyayan. His maternal aunt counseled him that success could be achieved by worshipping Shiva in the Himalayan region, and thus he went in search of the Himalayas to do penance. He arrived at a beautiful place in the eastern part of Arghakhanchi, Nepal, and used his body, mind and soul to do penance for Lord Shiva. Lord Shankara appeared at the place where Pānini had done penance, played the Damaru 14 times and gave him blessings.
