= Northwest Airlines Flight 2 =

1938 crash in Montana with no survivors

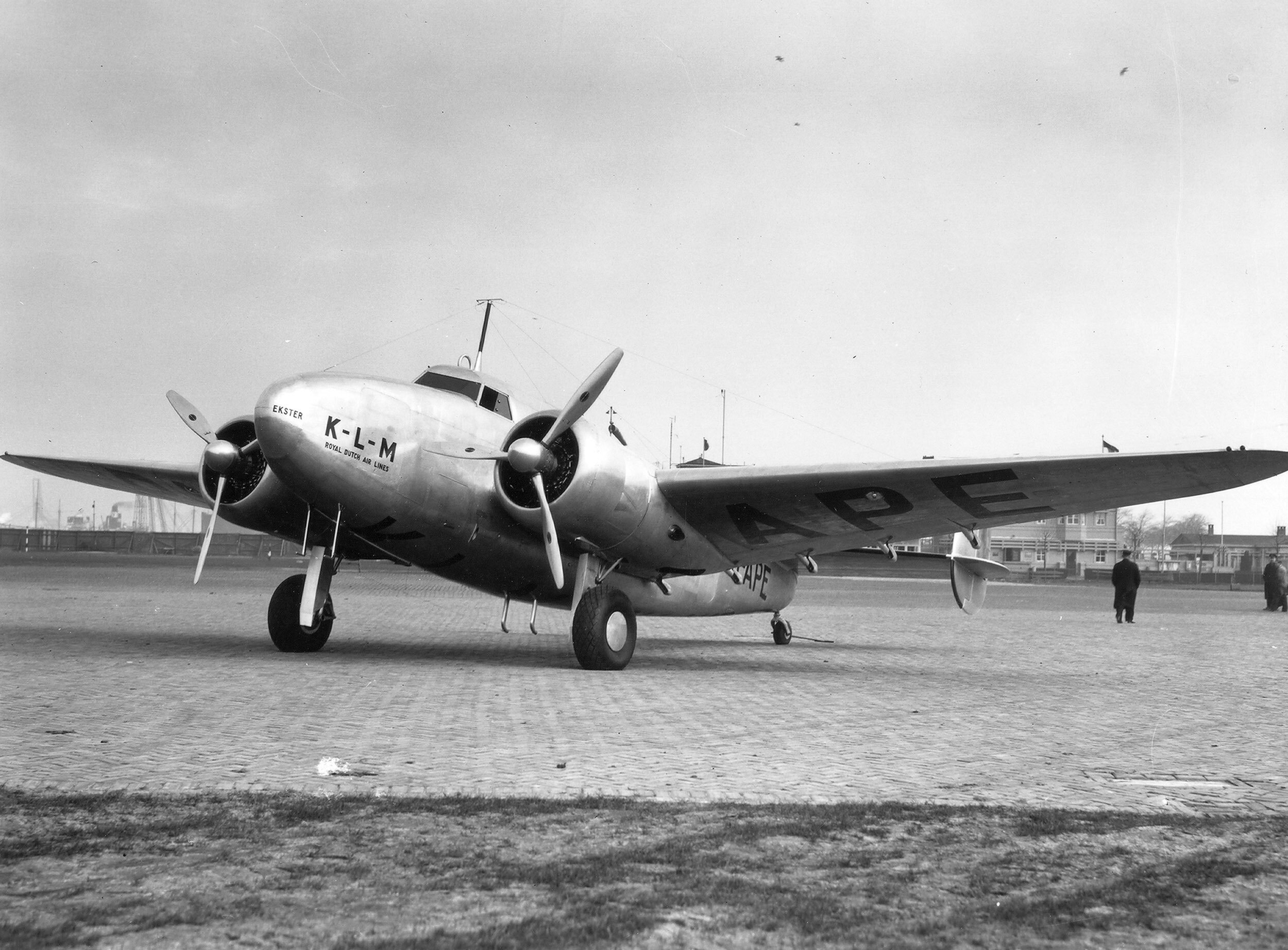
- A Super Electra similar to the aircraft

Occurrence
- Date: January 10, 1938
- Summary: Mechanical failure
- Site: Gallatin County, Montana, U.S. northeast of Bozeman; 45.8359°N 110.9385°W

Aircraft
- Aircraft type: Lockheed Model 14H Super Electra
- Operator: Northwest Airlines
- Registration: NC17388
- Flight origin: Seattle - Boeing Field
- 1st stopover: Spokane - Felts Field
- 2nd stopover: Butte Airport (BTM/KBTM)
- Last stopover: Billings Municipal Airport (BIL/KBIL)
- Destination: Chicago-Midway Airport (MDW/KMDW)
- Passengers: 8
- Crew: 2
- Fatalities: 10
- Survivors: 0

Northwest Airlines Flight 2 was a Lockheed Super Electra aircraft, registration NC17388, which crashed into the Bridger Mountains in Gallatin County, Montana, about twelve miles (20 km) northeast of Bozeman, on January 10, 1938. All ten people on board were killed in the accident, which was the first fatal crash of a Lockheed Super Electra and of a Northwest Airlines aircraft.

Flight 2 was en route eastbound from Seattle to Chicago, with intermediate stops at Spokane, Butte, and Billings, Montana. The Monday afternoon flight had just left Butte and was flying over Belgrade when it diverted to the north to avoid a dust storm over Bozeman Pass. The first officer contacted the Northwest Airlines radio operator at 3:05 PM MST to advise that Flight 2 had reached the cruising altitude of 9,000 feet (2,740 m) at 2:53 PM. Ground witnesses reported that as it passed over the Bridger Mountain range (which at the point the aircraft passed over an elevation of approximately 8,500 feet (2,590 m) above sea level) the aircraft immediately dropped, went into a stall, glided for a short time, then spun into the ground. The wreckage burst into flames, and all ten aboard died immediately.

The next day's edition of The New York Times carried the story on the top of its front page and reported in part: "BOZEMAN, Mont., Jan. 10 — A Northwest Airlines transport plane crashed on a snow-covered peak high in the Bridger Mountains fourteen miles northeast of here late today, carrying to their deaths ten persons listed as being aboard. Sheriff Lovitt I. Westlake of Bozeman, who led a party on bobsleds to the crash scene, said he counted nine bodies and they were charred beyond recognition. Northwest Airlines officials reported eight passengers and a crew of two were aboard. The fuselage of the plane was burned into a twisted mass of aluminum. Sheriff Westlake said that the plane appeared to have plunged nose first into the mountainside in a small clearing. Two ranchers, cutting wood on the rugged mountain slope, said they saw the plane burst into flames as it hit the ground."

Investigators with the Civil Aeronautics Authority (CAA), a predecessor organization of both the Federal Aviation Administration (FAA) and the National Transportation Safety Board (NTSB), determined that both vertical fins and both rudders were missing from the twin-tailed aircraft. They believed that the empennage had failed due to flutter. Weather reports from surrounding communities as well as the existence of the dust storm in Bozeman Pass led investigators to believe that the aircraft likely encountered severe to extreme turbulence which may have initiated the flutter.

Within 24 hours of the accident, the Department of Commerce (governing authority of the CAA) ordered that all Lockheed Super Electras be immediately grounded and that tests be performed to confirm that the figures obtained in the aircraft's original vibration tests were accurate. It was discovered that the machine used by Lockheed (and authorized by the Department of Commerce) to measure the natural vibration periods of the component parts of the aircraft had given Lockheed engineers misleading results. The Department ordered that the rudders of all Super Electras be modified so as to eliminate the possibility that flutter would cause an in-flight break-up.

Northwest had been the first U.S. airline to take delivery of the Super Electra, but sold most of its remaining Electra fleet in 1939 after three subsequent accidents called the airworthiness and commercial potential of the aircraft into question. One Electra crashed in Southern California while in the process of being delivered to the airline in Minnesota, and the other two in eastern Montana. The second, Flight 4, crashed in Billings after the pilot stalled the aircraft on takeoff. The third, Flight 1, crashed shortly after takeoff from Miles City after a design and manufacturing error allowed an intense fire to develop in the cockpit.

Flight 2 was piloted by Nick Mamer, a well-known aviation pioneer in the Pacific Northwest who had flown over a million miles (1.6 million km). The first officer (co-pilot) was Fred West, and two of the passengers were employees of the airline.

In 1939, a large Moderne clock tower was erected at Felts Field in Spokane, Washington, as a memorial to the victims of the Flight 2 crash in Bozeman. Bridger Bowl Ski Area is just south of the crash site.

== See also ==
- Aviation safety
- List of accidents and incidents involving commercial aircraft
