= Panino, Amur Oblast =

Rural locality in Amur Oblast, Russia

Panino Панино
- Selo
- Location within Amur Oblast Location within Russia
- Coordinates: 50°14′N 128°53′E
- Country: Russia
- Region: Amur Oblast
- District: Oktyabrsky District
- Time zone: UTC+9:00

Panino (Russian: Панино) is a rural locality (a selo) and the administrative center of Paninsky Selsoviet of Oktyabrsky District, Amur Oblast, Russia. The population was 202 as of 2018. There are 6 streets.

== Geography ==
Panino is located 24 km southwest of Yekaterinoslavka (the district's administrative centre) by road. Yuzhny is the nearest rural locality.
