= Buhl CA-1 Airster =

CA-1 Airster
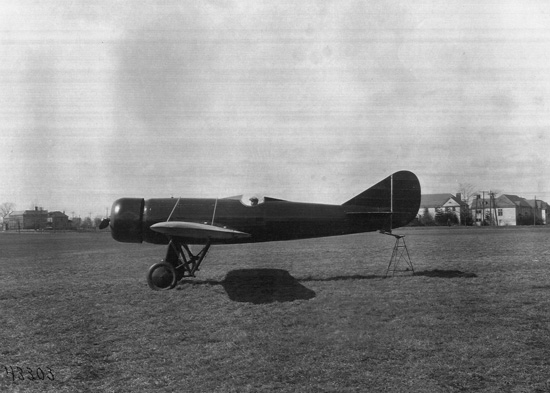

General information
- Type: Sportsplane
- Manufacturer: Buhl Aircraft Company
- Designer: Etienne Dormoy
- Number built: 2

History
- First flight: 1930

The Buhl CA-1 Airster was a sports airplane developed in the United States in 1930. It was a conventional low-wing cantilever monoplane with fixed tailwheel undercarriage and an open cockpit for the pilot.

== History ==
In 1930 the Buhl Aircraft Company built two light multipurpose Airster aircraft, which were free-floating low-flying airplanes. They differed in power plant and cockpit, with the single-seat CA-1 using a 300 hp Wright J-6 engine, and the two-seat CA-1WA using a 420 hp Pratt & Whitney Wasp engine. The two-seat variant was developed with a second open cockpit in tandem with the pilot's and with a Townend ring and wheel spats, but this didn't sell either.

The first aircraft was intended for high-speed mail delivery, the second for sporting events and air-racing. Neither of them could find their customers, and they were not put into mass production. The CA-1WA was slightly more fortunate - a single aircraft was bought by a private individual and used until the mid thirties.

== Versions ==
Data from http://www.airwar.ru/enc/law1/bihlca1.html
https://www.aviationfanatic.com/ent_show.php?ent=4&AT_ID=__BUCA1

General characteristics

- Crew: 2

Performance

== See also ==
- Buhl Airsedan
- Buhl-Verville CA-3 Airster
