= Panena =

Panena पणेना
- Village development committee
- Location in Lumbini Province Panena (Nepal)
- Coordinates: 27°52′26″N 83°18′34″E
- Country: Nepal
- Zone: Lumbini Zone
- District: Arghakhanchi District

Population (1991)
  - Total: 2,598
  - Religions: Hindu
- Time zone: UTC+5:45 (Nepal Time)

Panena is a small town in Arghakhanchi District in the Lumbini Zone of southern Nepal. At the time of the 1991 Nepal census it had a population of 2,598 and had 475 houses in the town.
