= Panino, Savinsky District, Ivanovo Oblast =

Panino Панино
- Village
- Location within Ivanovo Oblast Location within Russia
- Coordinates: 56°30′N 41°26′E
- Country: Russia
- Region: Ivanovo Oblast
- District: Savinsky District
- Time zone: UTC+3:00

Panino (Russian: Панино) is a rural locality (a village) in Savinsky District, Ivanovo Oblast, Russia. Population: 189 (2010 census);

== Geography ==
This rural locality is located 16 kilometres (9.9 mi) from Savino (the district's administrative centre), 60 kilometres (37 mi) from Ivanovo (capital of Ivanovo Oblast) and 249 kilometres (155 mi) from Moscow. Dubrovka is the nearest rural locality.
