= Panino, Perm Krai =

Panino Панино
- Village
- Location within Perm Krai Location within Russia
- Coordinates: 60°11′N 54°49′E
- Country: Russia
- Region: Perm Krai
- District: Kosinsky District
- Time zone: UTC+5:00

Panino (Russian: Панино) is a rural locality (a village) in Kosinskoye Rural Settlement, Kosinsky District, Perm Krai, Russia. The population was 73 as of 2010. There are 3 streets.

== Geography ==
Panino is located 34 km north of Kosa (the district's administrative centre) by road. Nyatyaino is the nearest rural locality.
