= Pani =

Family name

Pāṇi or Pany is a surname used in India, found often in the state of Odisha (formerly Orissa). This surname is used by Brahmins whose root is claimed to be traced to Ujjain and to the period of Kalidasa.

== History ==
There are two stories of how this surname (or caste name) came about. The first one says the great grammar pundit Pāṇini is the ancestor of Pāṇis, and the other story is that a king of Kalinga conferred the title Pāṇi to Brahmins who could easily memorize all of the Vedas.

Pani reached their zenith and were revered as ministers in the period of king Vikramaditya (1st century AD).

Pani migrated to Orissa in the 12th century AD after king Jajati Keshari invited them for a yajna that was held to honour Shiva.

Pani families in Purulia district have been Zamindars (in Chakradharpur, Puri, Barabazar.

Some Pāṇis migrated inland to the tribal areas of Jharkhand and settled during the Mughal period (17th century). Their descendants still identify themselves as residents of Orissa.

== Notable people ==
Notable people with the surname include:

- Baishnaba Pani (1882–1956), Indian writer and theatre director
- Biswamohan Pani, former design engineer at Intel
- Bhavna Pani, Indian actress, model, and dancer
- Ravi Narayan Pani, Indian politician
- Uday Shankar Pani, Indian filmmaker
