= Type certificate =

Document noting the airworthiness of a certain type of aircraft

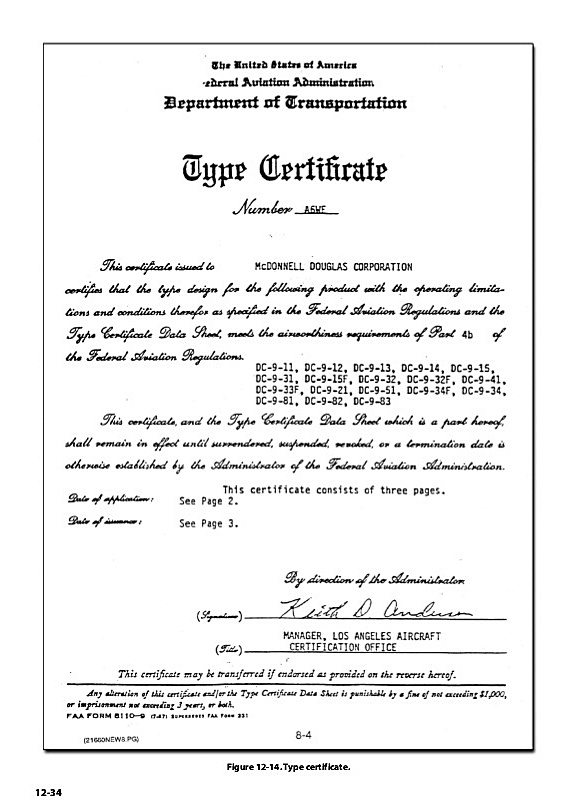
Sample type certificate issued by the USA FAA for the DC-9 aeroplane

A type certificate signifies the airworthiness of a particular design of aircraft, according to the airworthiness standards applicable by law in the country in which the certificate is issued. The particular design is called an aircraft type, and it is defined by its type design. Certification confirms that all aircraft of a new type intended for serial production will comply with applicable airworthiness standards established by the national air law.

For up to three seats, primary category aircraft certification costs around US$1 million, US$25 million for a general aviation aircraft and hundreds of millions of dollars for a commercial aircraft; certification delays can cost millions of dollars and can decide a program's profitability.

== Authority ==
A type certificate (TC) is issued to signify the airworthiness of the approved design or "type" of an aircraft to be manufactured. The TC is issued by a regulatory authority, and once issued, the design cannot be changed unless at least part of the process for certification is repeated to cover the changes. The TC reflects a determination made by a regulatory authority that the type design complies with airworthiness requirements. Examples of regulatory authorities are the United Kingdom's Civil Aviation Authority (CAA), the U.S. Federal Aviation Administration (FAA), the European Aviation Safety Agency (EASA), Transport Canada, Brazil's Agência Nacional de Aviação Civil and the Civil Aviation Administration of China (CAAC).

When changes are needed to an airframe or on-board equipment, there are two options. One is to initiate a modification by the type design holder (manufacturer), and the other is to request a third-party Supplemental type certificate (STC). The choice is determined by considering whether the change constitutes a new design (i.e. introduces risk not considered in the first type design). If so, then type design holder must develop and approve a modification to the type design. If the regulatory authority agrees the change does not introduce new risk, the STC option is available. An STC is less expensive because the design change can be developed by a specialized design organization, a generally more flexible and efficient process than going through the original manufacturer. The STC defines the product design change, states how the modification affects the existing type design, and lists serial numbers of the aircraft affected. It also identifies the certification basis for regulatory compliance for the design change.

The TC implies that aircraft manufactured according to the approved design can be issued an airworthiness certificate. To meet those requirements the aircraft and each sub-assembly must also be approved. For example, in the U.S. these sub-assemblies must meet requirements in the applicable Technical Standards Order (TSO). To meet those requirements the design documents are examined for compliance with the applicable Minimum Operating Performance Standards (MOPS) applicable to that sub-assembly. MOPS are published by expert industry groups such as: RTCA Inc., EUROCAE, and SAE.

When aircraft are produced to meet a given TC, each one need not be tested as rigorously but the confidence demonstrated by the TC is conferred when the aircraft has been assigned a certificate of airworthiness (CoA). A CoA is issued for each aircraft that is properly registered if it conforms to its type design and is ready for safe operation. The CoA is valid and the aircraft may be operated as long as it is maintained in accordance with the rules issued by the regulatory authority.

== History ==
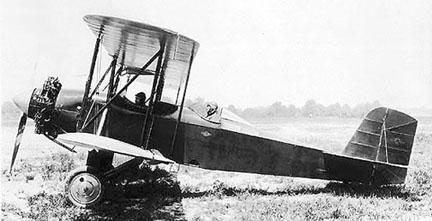
The Buhl-Verville CA-3 Airster the first US type certificated aircraft

The concept of a 'type certificate' was introduced by the "Air Navigation Regulations" published in May 1919 by the UK's Secretary of State for Air, Winston Churchill.

The Buhl-Verville CA-3 Airster was the first aircraft to receive a type certificate in the US, (i.e. A.T.C. No. 1) issued by the Aeronautics Branch of the Department of Commerce on March 29, 1927.

== Aircraft type certification ==
=== Prototype ===
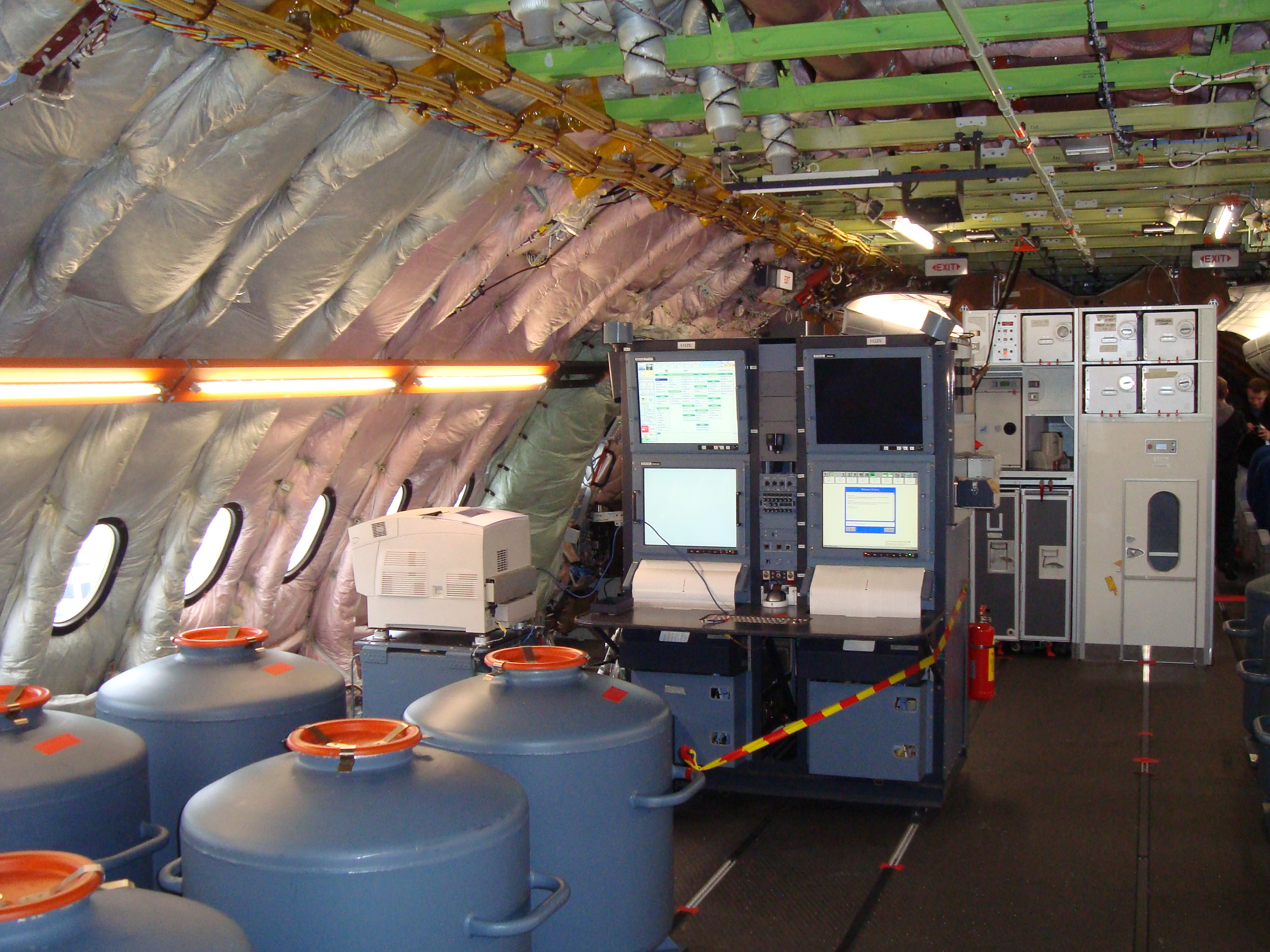
Test equipment on-board the A-380 very large aeroplane prototype intended for certification flight testing

Initially, the applicant design organisation submits documents to its local aviation regulating body, detailing how the proposed aircraft type design would fulfill the airworthiness requirements. After investigations by the regulator, the final approval of such documents (after the required comments and amendments in order to fulfill the laws) becomes the basis of the certification. The firm follows it and draws a proposed timetable of actions required for certification tests. With the application, the regulations to be applied will usually be frozen for this application for a given amount of time in order to avoid a situation where the applicant would have to change the design as a result of changed regulations.

An initial design sample known as a prototype is built. This refers to either the aircraft, the engines or the propeller, depending based on the certification. For the purpose of illustration, the discussion shall be limited to the aircraft. Normally a few prototypes are built, each subject to different tests. The prototypes are first used for ground and system tests. One of the prototypes (known as the "static airframe") is subject to destructive testing, i.e., the prototype is subject to stress beyond normal and abnormal operations until destruction. The test results are compared with initial submitted calculations to establish the ultimate structural strength.

Other prototypes will undergo other systems tests until the satisfaction of the regulators. With all ground tests completed, prototypes are made ready for flight tests. The flight tests are flown by specially approved flight test pilots who will fly the prototypes to establish the ultimate flight limits which should be within the airworthiness rules. If a long-range airliner is tested, the flight tests may cover the whole world. Tests may also cover different environments - high and low altitude, freezing and hot climates, and so on, to confirm correct performance throughout the aircraft's design envelope.

In parallel with aircraft testing, the applicant firm also draws up a maintenance program to support continuous airworthiness after approval of the design. The program is drawn with inputs from test results and also from initial customers' engineering departments. The proposed maintenance program is submitted to the regulators for comment and approval.

After successful completion of ground and flight tests, along with an approved maintenance program, the prototype is approved, and the firm is granted the TC for the prototype (as understood that it should include all furnished equipment for its intended role). The legal term for the firm is now the "type certificate holder". Subsequently, the prototype serves as a template for serial aircraft production and aircraft rolling out of the factory should be identical to the prototype within the frames outlined in a TC data sheet, and each given a serial number (a "series aircraft").

=== Continuing airworthiness ===
==== Aircraft maintenance ====
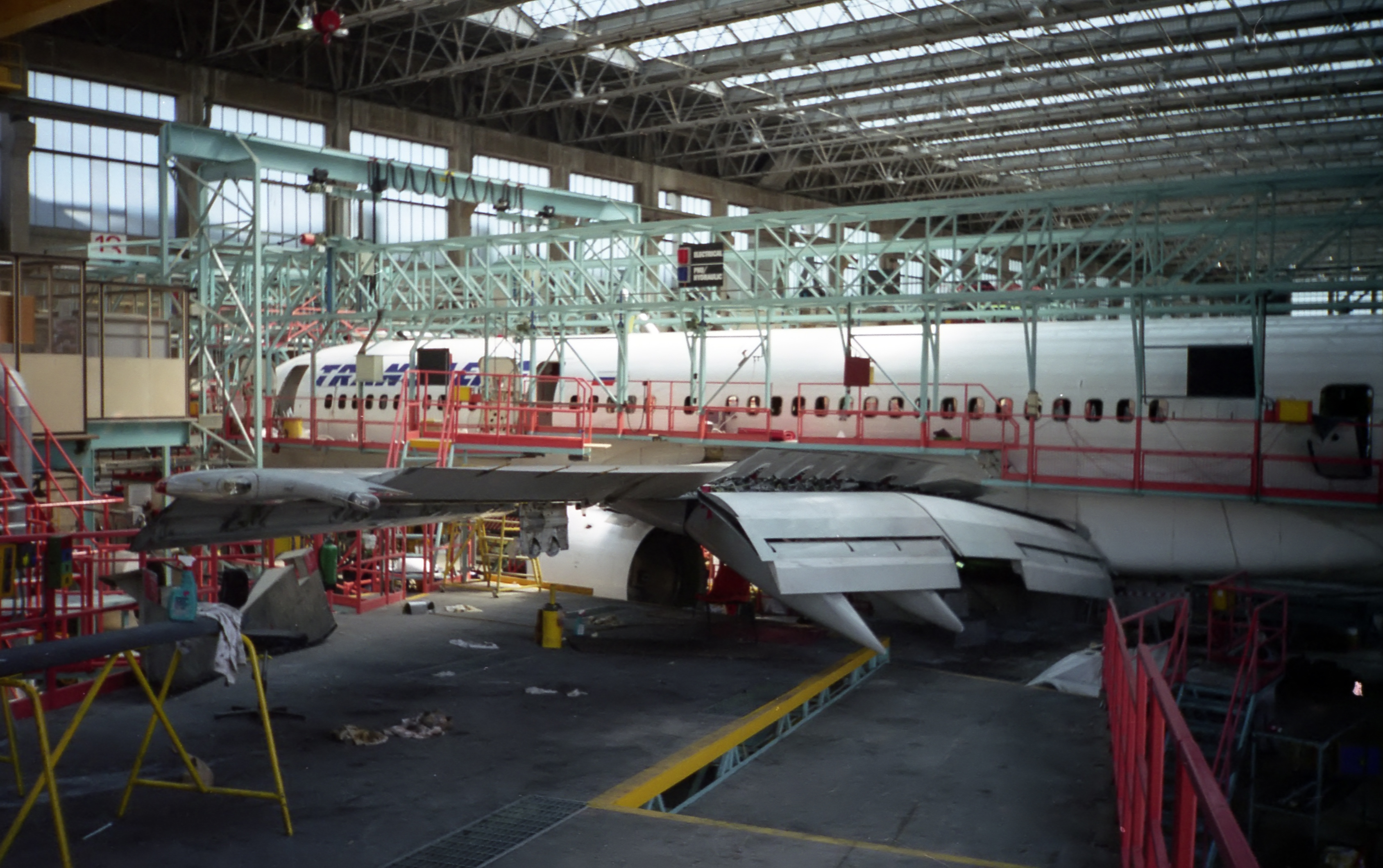
Transaero Boeing 757 undergoing C-check maintenance at the British Airways Engineering maintenance base (1996)

As the aircraft enters service, it is subject to operational wear and tear which may cause performance degradations. The set of processes by which an aircraft, engine, propeller or part complies with applicable airworthiness requirements and remains in a condition for safe operation throughout its operating life is called continuing airworthiness. A maintenance program is issued by the aircraft operator and approved by the regulatory authority of the state of registry to maintain the airworthiness of the aircraft of the type owned by the operator. Maintenance tasks outlined in the maintenance program have to be scheduled and timely accomplished in order for the airworthiness certificate of their aircraft to remain valid.

Other continuing airworthiness activities include additional tasks associated with the maintenance program and design changes to be accomplished via:

- Airworthiness directives (ADs)
- Service bulletins (SBs)

==== Airworthiness directives ====
Sometimes during service, the aircraft may encounter problems that may compromise the aircraft's safety, which are not anticipated or detected in prototype testing stages. The aircraft design is thus compromised. The regulators will now issue an airworthiness directive to the type certificate holder and to all owners globally. The directive normally consists of additional maintenance or design actions that are necessary to restore the type's airworthiness. Compliance is mandatory and thus if an operator does not comply with an AD, then the datum aircraft is not considered airworthy and further operation of the affected aircraft type would be unlawful, making the operator liable to legal action by the relevant national aviation authority, and rendering null-and-void any of the operator's insurance policies relating to the type, such as hull loss and accident third party coverage. ADs may also be raised with changes to the local or global aviation rules and requirements, e.g., the requirement to fit armored cockpit doors for all passenger airliners after the September 11 attacks.

The certifying authority issues an AD when an unsafe condition is found to exist in a product (aircraft, aircraft engine, propeller, or appliance) of a particular type design. ADs are used by the certifying authority to notify aircraft owners and operators of unsafe conditions and to require their correction. ADs prescribe the conditions and limitations, including inspection, repair, or alteration under which the product may continue to be operated.

==== Service bulletins ====
With increasing in-service experience, the type certificate holder may find ways to improve the original design resulting in either lower maintenance costs or increased performance. These improvements (normally involving some alterations) are suggested through service bulletins to aircraft owners/operators as optional (and may be extra cost) items. The owner/operator shall exercise discretion whether to incorporate the bulletins and report the decision to the regulatory authority of the state of the aircraft registry. Sometimes SBs can become mandated by relevant ADs.

=== Changes to type certificate ===
Often the basic design is enhanced further by the type certificate holder. Major changes beyond the authority of the service bulletins require amendments to the type certificate. For example, increasing (or decreasing) an aircraft's flight performance, range and load carrying capacity by altering its systems, fuselage, wings or engines resulting in a new variant may require re-certification. Again the basic process of type certifications is repeated (including maintenance programs). However, unaltered items from the basic design need not be retested. Normally, one or two of the original prototype fleet are remanufactured to the new proposed design. As long as the new design does not deviate too much from the original, static airframes do not need to be built. The resultant new prototypes are again subjected to flight tests.

Upon successful completion of the certification program, the original type certificate is amended to include the new variant (normally denoted by a new model number in addition to the original type designation). Typical examples are; the Boeing 737NG (737-600, 737-700, 737-800 and 737-900) which replaced the 737 Original family (737-100 and 737-200) and the 737 Classic family (737-300, 737-400 and 737-500) and the Airbus A340-500 and the A340-600 which is based on the Airbus A340-200 and the A340-300.

=== Supplementary/supplemental type certificate (STC) ===
Any additions, omissions or alterations to the aircraft's certified layout, built-in equipment, airframe and engines, initiated by any party other than the type certificate holder, need an approved supplementary ("supplemental" in FAA terminology) type certificate, or STC. The scope of an STC can be extremely narrow or broad. It could include minor modifications to passenger cabin items or installed instruments. More substantial modifications may involve engine replacement, as in the Blackhawk modifications to Cessna Conquest and Beechcraft King Air turboprops, or a complete role change for the aircraft, such as converting a B-17 or Stearman into an agricultural aircraft. STCs are applied due to either the type certificate holder's refusal (frequently due to economics) or its inability to meet some owners' requirements. STCs are frequently raised for out-of-production aircraft types' conversions to fit new roles. Before STCs are issued, procedures similar to type certificate changes for new variants are followed, likely including thorough flight tests. STCs belong to the STC holder and are generally more restrictive than type certificate changes.

=== Validity ===
The TC holder remains responsible for the continued integrity of the approved aircraft type design and must remain the focal point for resolving issues that may require corrective action. This requires the continued capability, or access to a capability, of providing appropriate technical solutions for service difficulties or mandatory corrective action. If the holder is no longer capable or if the TC is transferred to another holder a regulatory authority should take appropriate action in accordance with the national legislation. In the case of the TC being transferred to another holder the new holder shall be capable of fulfilling the TC holder responsibilities in following ADs and providing technical support to keep the type design current with the applicable airworthiness requirements, even after the production of the aircraft type has stopped but many out-of-production aircraft continue to have useful lives. STCs are also bound by the same rules. When the holder decides to stop supporting the aircraft type without transferring TC holder responsibilities, the TC is returned to the issuing regulatory authority and the remaining aircraft fleet can be grounded by the current states of registry until further decisions on the registered aircraft continuing airworthiness. In this manner the whole Concorde fleet was finally grounded when Airbus SAS surrendered its TC.

== See also ==
Experimental aircraft
