= Carlos Panini =

Carlos Panini Binosi was a wealthy Mexican businessman of Italian origin, from Mosio di Acquanegra sul Chiese. He is credited with being the first pilot to fly a light plane around the world. In 1927 he had established Mexico's first scheduled airline, Servicio Aéreo Panini which he had sold shortly prior to the car race in which he died, as he was planning to retire.

He was a motorsport enthusiast and participated in numerous competitions.

Panini died when his car crashed during the 1951 Carrera Panamericana on the second stage from Oaxaca to Puebla. Although the registered driver for the race was Carlos' daughter Teresa (Teresita), he was at the wheel of the car, despite the fact that he did not have a valid license and was in ill health. The accident happened when Bobby Unser, aged 17 years 9 months, was trying to overtake Panini who was travelling at a lower speed and blocked the American for a long stretch. After several attempts, Unser made his move but Panini tried too late to block him, resulting in the two cars bumping one another. Unser nearly went off a sheer cliff but was skilled enough to control his Jaguar, while Panini's Alfa Romeo went straight into a wall, killing the driver instantly. Unser did not stop for fear of being disqualified from the race as the rules explicitly forbade it. Later, Ricardo Ramirez of Mexico City abandoned the race to rush the Paninis to a hospital in Puebla. Teresa Panini survived the accident with minor injuries.

Press reaction to his death was strong in condemning the race as his was a part of a series of prominent deaths that year. At the time of his death newspapers gave his age as 54, but one states his age as 48.
