= Buhl (surname) =

Buhl is a surname of German origin.

It is derived from the Middle High German word buole, meaning "kinsman", which was used as a nickname for a male relative. In some cases, it is also a variant form of the surname Bühl where the Umlaut was lost.

== Notable people with the name ==
- Adolphe Buhl (1878–1949), French mathematician and astronomer
- Angie Buhl (born 1985), American politician
- Bob Buhl (1928–2001), American baseball player
- Christian H. Buhl (1810–1894), American politician and businessman
- Christine Buhl Andersen (born 1967), Danish art historian and museum director
- Frank H. Buhl (1848–1918), American businessman and philanthropist
- Frederick Buhl (1806–1890), American politician and businessman
- Hermann Buhl, (1924–1957), Austrian climber
- Hermann Buhl (runner) (1935–2014), German middle-distance runner
- Ingeborg Buhl (1880–1963), Danish fencer
- Jonas Buhl Bjerre (born 2004), Danish chess player
- Jonté Buhl (born 1982), American football player
- Josh Buhl (born 1981), American football player
- Jørgen Buhl Rasmussen (born 1955), Danish businessman
- Karl Buhl (born 1940), German cross-country skier
- Lene Buhl-Mortensen (born 1956), Danish-Norwegian marine biologist
- Ludwig von Buhl (1816–1880), German pathologist
- Lærke Buhl-Hansen (born 1992), Danish sailor
- Melissa Buhl (born 1982), American racing cyclist
- Philipp Buhl (born 1989), German competitive sailor
- Robbie Buhl (born 1963), American race car driver
- Theodor Buhl (1865–1922), British stamp dealer
- Vilhelm Buhl (1881–1954), Danish politician, Prime Minister of Denmark
- Zygmunt Buhl (1927–1978), Polish sprinter

== See also ==
- Buhl (disambiguation)
- Bühl (surname)
- Buhler (surname)
