= Kappelen =

- Municipality
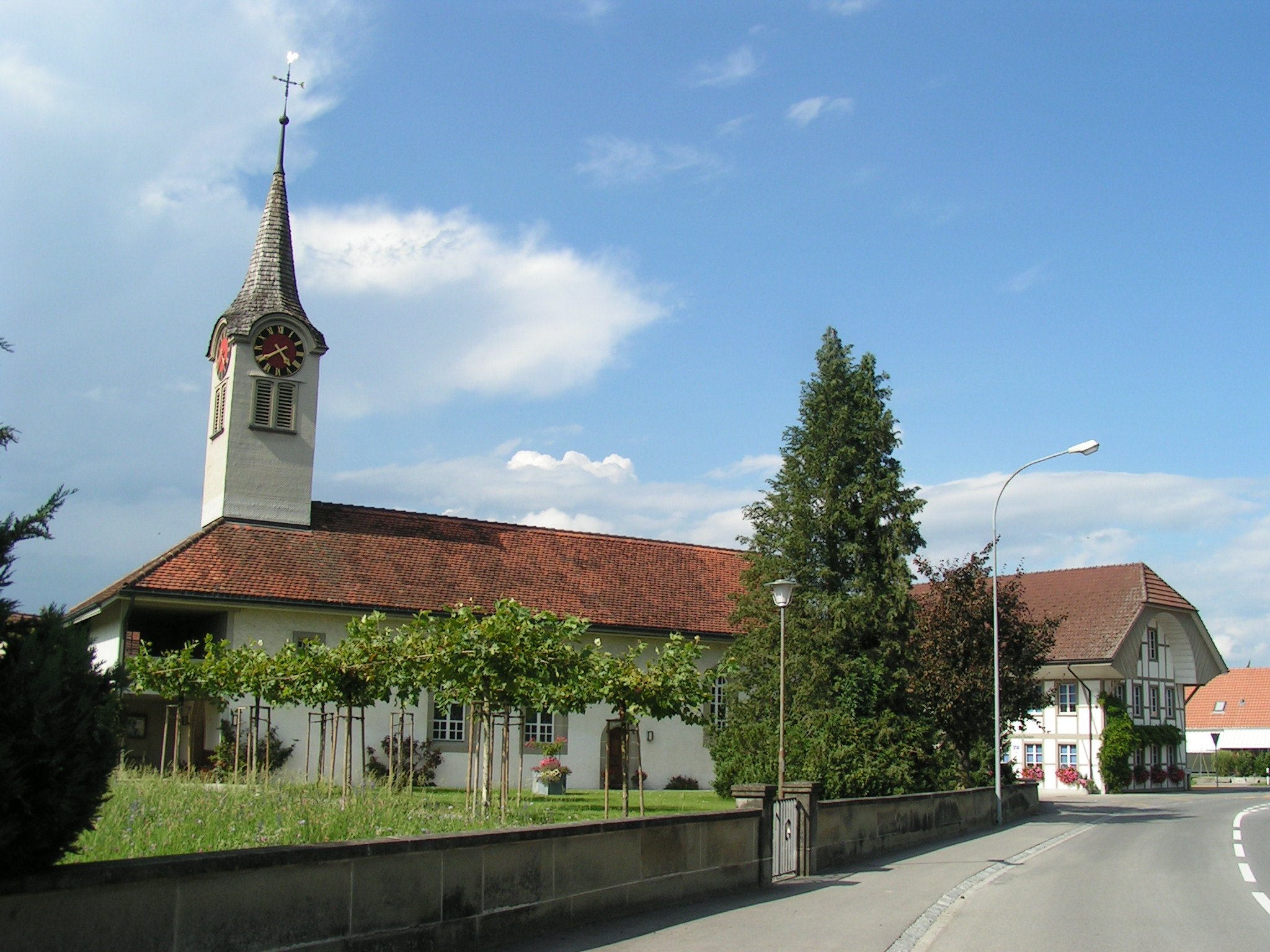
- Kappelen village church and town hall

- Flag Coat of arms
- Location of Kappelen
- Location within Switzerland Location within Canton of Bern
- Coordinates: 47°4′N 7°16′E
- Country: Switzerland
- Canton: Bern
- District: Seeland

Area
  - Total: 10.98 km^{2} (4.24 sq mi)
- Elevation: 437 m (1,434 ft)

Population (December 2020)
  - Total: 1,420
  - Density: 129/km^{2} (335/sq mi)
- Time zone: UTC+01:00 (CET)
  - Summer (DST): UTC+02:00 (CEST)
- Postal code: 3273
- SFOS number: 305
- ISO 3166 code: CH-BE
- Surrounded by: Aarberg, Bargen, Bühl, Hermrigen, Jens, Lyss, Merzligen, Walperswil, Worben
- Website: kappelen.ch

Kappelen (French: Chapelle) is a municipality in the Seeland administrative district in the canton of Bern in Switzerland.

== History ==
Kappelen is first mentioned in 1228 as Capella.

The Roman road between Aventicum and Petinesca ran along the present day border of the municipality. During the Middle Ages, one of the major landowners in the village was the Counts of Neuchâtel-Nidau. The count granted Frienisberg Abbey land in Kappelen in 1225 and 1267. They gave Gottstatt Monastery patronage over the village church in 1247. The monastery held that right until 1528, when it was taken by Bern. Even after they granted land to the monasteries, the counts retained the right to collect a tithe from the village. The Counts of Neuchâtel-Aarberg originally had the right to hold the low court in the village. In 1367 this right went to Nidau and in 1377-79 it went to the city of Bern. At that time the village became part of the bailiwick of Aarberg. The neighboring village (and now part of the municipality) of Werdthof, the right to hold the low court in Werdthof and the chapel of St. Margaret (mentioned between 1231 and 1300, now demolished) were all given to Frienisberg Monastery in the 13th century.

The village church of St. Martin was first mentioned in 1228. It was destroyed in 1290 and rebuilt soon thereafter. It was rebuilt and expanded in 1682.

The Aare river flooded periodically, destroying or damaging the village, until the construction of the Hagneck Canal in 1868–78. After construction of the canal the swampy land around the village slowly drained, creating additional farm land. In the mid 19th century agriculture changed from growing produce and breeding horses to breeding livestock and dairy farming. The first cheese maker opened in Kappelen in 1868. Starting around 1900, the farms switched to growing sugar beets for the sugar factory in Aarberg. Agriculture has remained important in the local economy though a freight yard operated between 1954 and 1968. Between 1970 and 1974 there was a cantonal Civil Defense Training Center in the village. In 1982-83 a regional office and maintenance depot of the cantonal construction department opened. While the village has no rail connection, it has been serviced by a bus from Biel and Aarberg since 1967 and the private Biel-Kappelen Airport.

== Geography ==
Aerial view by Walter Mittelholzer (1923)

Kappelen has an area of 10.97 km^{2} (4.24 sq mi). Of this area, 8.04 km^{2} (3.10 mi^{2}) or 73.4% is used for agricultural purposes, while 1.56 km^{2} (0.60 mi^{2}) or 14.2% is forested. Of the rest of the land, 1.19 km^{2} (0.46 mi^{2}) or 10.9% is settled (buildings or roads), 0.04 km^{2} (9.9 acres) or 0.4% is either rivers or lakes and 0.05 km^{2} (12 acres) or 0.5% is unproductive land.

Of the built up area, housing and buildings made up 3.9% and transportation infrastructure made up 5.7%. Out of the forested land, all of the forested land area is covered with heavy forests. Of the agricultural land, 67.7% is used for growing crops and 4.8% is pastures. All the water in the municipality is in lakes.

The municipality is located on what used to be the left bank of the Aare river. It consists of the village of Kappelen and the village section of Werdthof.

== Coat of arms ==
The blazon of the municipal coat of arms is Azure a Chapel Argent roofed Gules. The chapel (German: Kappelle) on the coat of arms is an example of canting arms.

== Demographics ==
Kappelen has a population (as of December 2020) of 1,420. As of 2010, 4.2% of the population are resident foreign nationals. Over the last 10 years (2000–2010) the population has changed at a rate of 31.3%. Migration accounted for 29.5%, while births and deaths accounted for 2.4%.

Most of the population (as of 2000) speaks German (970 or 87.2%) as their first language, Arabic is the second most common (18 or 1.6%) and Albanian is the third (17 or 1.5%). There are 13 people who speak French, 5 people who speak Italian.

As of 2008, the population was 49.5% male and 50.5% female. The population was made up of 589 Swiss men (46.9% of the population) and 33 (2.6%) non-Swiss men. There were 615 Swiss women (48.9%) and 2 (0.2%) non-Swiss women. Of the population in the municipality, 349 or about 31.4% were born in Kappelen and lived there in 2000. There were 467 or 42.0% who were born in the same canton, while 108 or 9.7% were born somewhere else in Switzerland, and 116 or 10.4% were born outside of Switzerland.

As of 2000, children and teenagers (0–19 years old) make up 26% of the population, while adults (20–64 years old) make up 60.5% and seniors (over 64 years old) make up 13.5%.

As of 2000, there were 467 people who were single and never married in the municipality. There were 517 married individuals, 87 widows or widowers and 41 individuals who are divorced.

As of 2000, there were 405 private households in the municipality, and an average of 2.4 persons per household. There were 110 households that consist of only one person and 30 households with five or more people. In 2000, a total of 387 apartments (91.7% of the total) were permanently occupied, while 21 apartments (5.0%) were seasonally occupied and 14 apartments (3.3%) were empty. As of 2009, the construction rate of new housing units was 11.1 new units per 1000 residents. The vacancy rate for the municipality, in 2010, was 1.32%.

The historical population is given in the following chart:

== Politics ==
In the 2007 federal election the most popular party was the SVP which received 52.84% of the vote. The next three most popular parties were the SPS (15.52%), the FDP (9.83%) and the Green Party (7.98%). In the federal election, a total of 377 votes were cast, and the voter turnout was 44.8%.

== Economy ==
As of 2010, Kappelen had an unemployment rate of 1.4%. As of 2008, there were 113 people employed in the primary economic sector and about 31 businesses involved in this sector. 293 people were employed in the secondary sector and there were 26 businesses in this sector. 153 people were employed in the tertiary sector, with 29 businesses in this sector.

In 2008 the total number of full-time equivalent jobs was 477. The number of jobs in the primary sector was 76, all of which were in agriculture. The number of jobs in the secondary sector was 269 of which 154 or (57.2%) were in manufacturing and 116 (43.1%) were in construction. The number of jobs in the tertiary sector was 132. In the tertiary sector; 27 or 20.5% were in wholesale or retail sales or the repair of motor vehicles, 3 or 2.3% were in the movement and storage of goods, 18 or 13.6% were in a hotel or restaurant, 3 or 2.3% were in the information industry, 41 or 31.1% were technical professionals or scientists, and 20 or 15.2% were in health care.

In 2000, there were 153 workers who commuted into the municipality and 389 workers who commuted away. The municipality is a net exporter of workers, with about 2.5 workers leaving the municipality for every one entering. Of the working population, 9% used public transportation to get to work, and 54.6% used a private car.

== Religion ==
From the 2000 census, 67 or 6.0% were Roman Catholic, while 822 or 73.9% belonged to the Swiss Reformed Church. Of the rest of the population, there were 5 members of an Orthodox church (or about 0.45% of the population), and there were 34 individuals (or about 3.06% of the population) who belonged to another Christian church. There were 90 (or about 8.09% of the population) who were Islamic. There was 1 person who was Hindu and 1 individual who belonged to another church. 65 (or about 5.85% of the population) belonged to no church, are agnostic or atheist, and 43 individuals (or about 3.87% of the population) did not answer the question.

== Education ==
In Kappelen about 424 or (38.1%) of the population have completed non-mandatory upper secondary education, and 116 or (10.4%) have completed additional higher education (either university or a Fachhochschule). Of the 116 who completed tertiary schooling, 69.0% were Swiss men, 23.3% were Swiss women and 4.3% were non-Swiss women.

The Canton of Bern school system provides one year of non-obligatory Kindergarten, followed by six years of Primary school. This is followed by three years of obligatory lower Secondary school where the students are separated according to ability and aptitude. Following the lower Secondary students may attend additional schooling or they may enter an apprenticeship.

During the 2009–10 school year, there were a total of 131 students attending classes in Kappelen. There was one kindergarten class with a total of 17 students in the municipality. The municipality had 4 primary classes and 89 students. Of the primary students, 5.6% were permanent or temporary residents of Switzerland (not citizens). During the same year, there were 2 lower secondary classes with a total of 25 students. There were 4.0% who were permanent or temporary residents of Switzerland (not citizens) and 4.0% have a different mother language than the classroom language.

As of 2000, there was one student in Kappelen who came from another municipality, while 60 residents attended schools outside the municipality.

== Transport ==
Kappelen is home to Biel-Kappelen Airport, which has an ICAO code of LSZP.
