= Bühl =

Bühl may refer to:

== Places ==
- Bühl (Baden), in the district Rastatt, Germany
- Bühl (Klettgau), in the municipality of Klettgau, Baden-Württemberg, Germany
- Bühl (Tübingen), in the Tübingen district, Baden-Württemberg, Germany
- Bühl bei Aarberg, in the Canton of Bern, Switzerland
- Hohe Bühl, hill in Germany
- Sportplatz Bühl, Schaffhausen, Switzerland

== People ==
- Bühl (surname), including list of people with the name

== See also ==
- Buhl (disambiguation)
- Buel (disambiguation)
- Bühler (disambiguation)
