= Bühl (surname) =

Bühl or Buehl is a surname of German origin. It is derived from the German noun Bühl, meaning "hill", and is thus a topographic surname for a person living on or next to a hill.

== Notable people with the name ==
- Alfons Bühl (1900–1988), German physicist
- Andreas Bühl (born 1987), German politician
- Ernest H. Buehl Sr. (1897–1990), German-American aviator
- Hede Bühl (born 1940), German sculptor
- Klara Bühl (born 2000), German football player
- Marcus Bühl (born 1977), German politician
- Michael Bühl (born 1962), German chemist

== See also ==
- Buhl (surname)
- Bühler (surname)
- Bühl (disambiguation)
