= Buhl =

Buhl may refer to:

== Places ==
=== France ===
- Buhl, Bas-Rhin
- Buhl, Haut-Rhin
- Buhl-Lorraine, Moselle

=== Germany ===
- Bühl (disambiguation)

=== United States ===
- Buhl, Alabama
- Buhl, Idaho
- Buhl, Minnesota

== People ==
- Buhl (surname), list of people with the name

== Other uses ==
- Buhl Aircraft Company
- Buhl Altarpiece in Buhl, Haut-Rhin
- Buhl Building, in Detroit, Michigan
- Buhl Building (Pittsburgh, Pennsylvania)

== See also ==
- Buhl Airster (disambiguation)
- Bühl (disambiguation)
- Buhla, Thuringia, Germany
- Buhle, a surname
