= Hagneck =

- Municipality
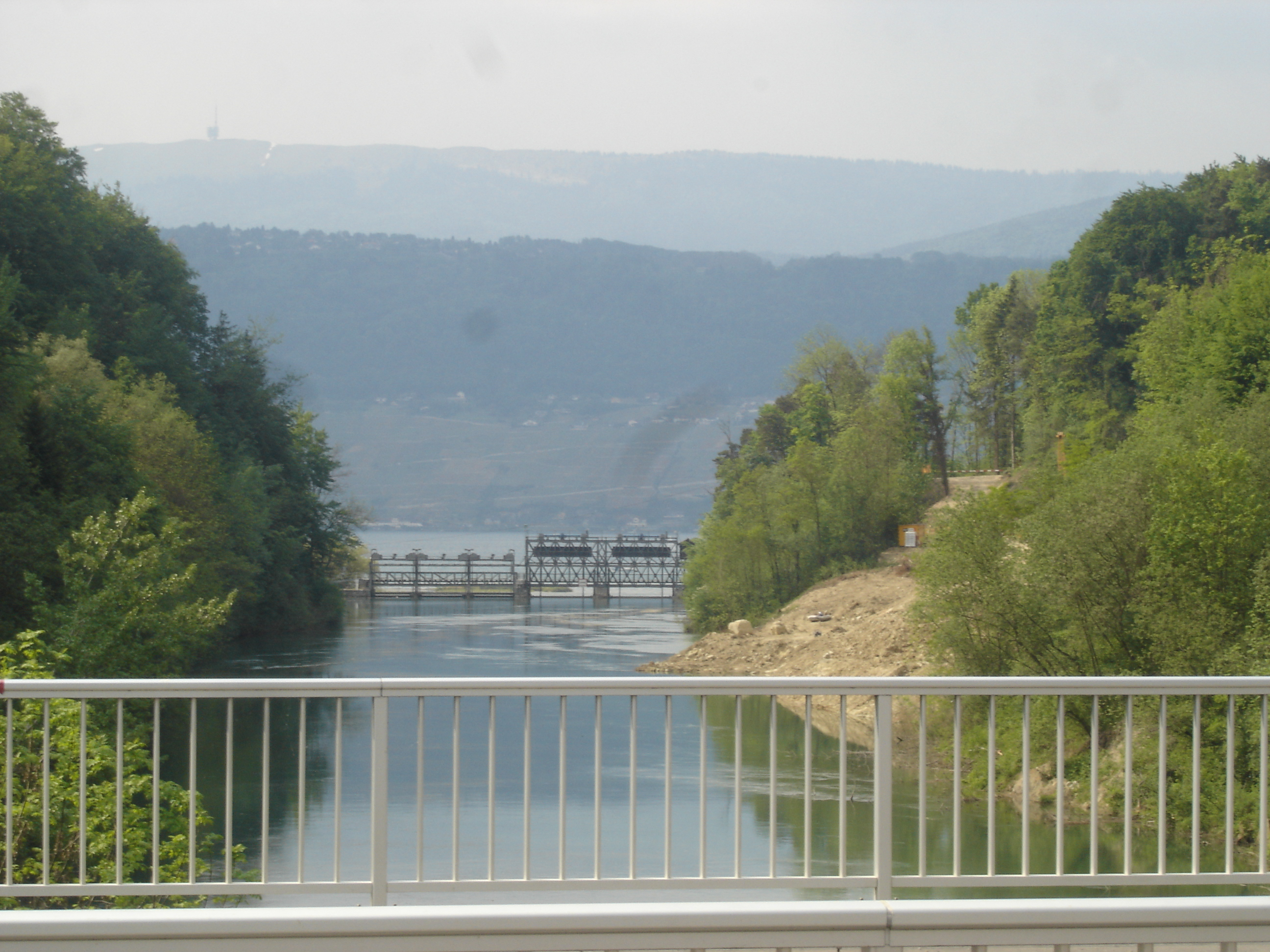
- Hagneck Canal near Hagneck

- Flag Coat of arms
- Location of Hagneck
- Location within Switzerland Location within Canton of Bern
- Coordinates: 47°3′N 7°11′E
- Country: Switzerland
- Canton: Bern
- District: Seeland

Area
  - Total: 1.8 km^{2} (0.69 sq mi)
- Elevation: 441 m (1,447 ft)

Population (Dec 2011)
  - Total: 417
  - Density: 230/km^{2} (600/sq mi)
- Time zone: UTC+01:00 (CET)
  - Summer (DST): UTC+02:00 (CEST)
- Postal code: 2575
- SFOS number: 736
- ISO 3166 code: CH-BE
- Surrounded by: Ligerz, Lüscherz, Siselen, Täuffelen, Twann, Walperswil
- Website: https://hagneck.ch/ SFSO statistics

Hagneck is a municipality in the Seeland administrative district in the canton of Bern in Switzerland.

== History ==
=== Archeological discoveries ===
Traces of early and late Bronze Age settlements have been found in the Hagneck marshland, which is part of the Grand Marais. Construction on a hill that separated the marshes from the lake resulted in the destruction of what appeared to be a 200 m (660 ft) Roman era drainage pipe. A portion of the Roman road between Vinelz and Täuffelen is still visible near village. Scattered medieval artifacts have been found near the marsh and the remains of a medieval castle were destroyed during construction of the Hagnek channel.

=== Foundation and growth ===
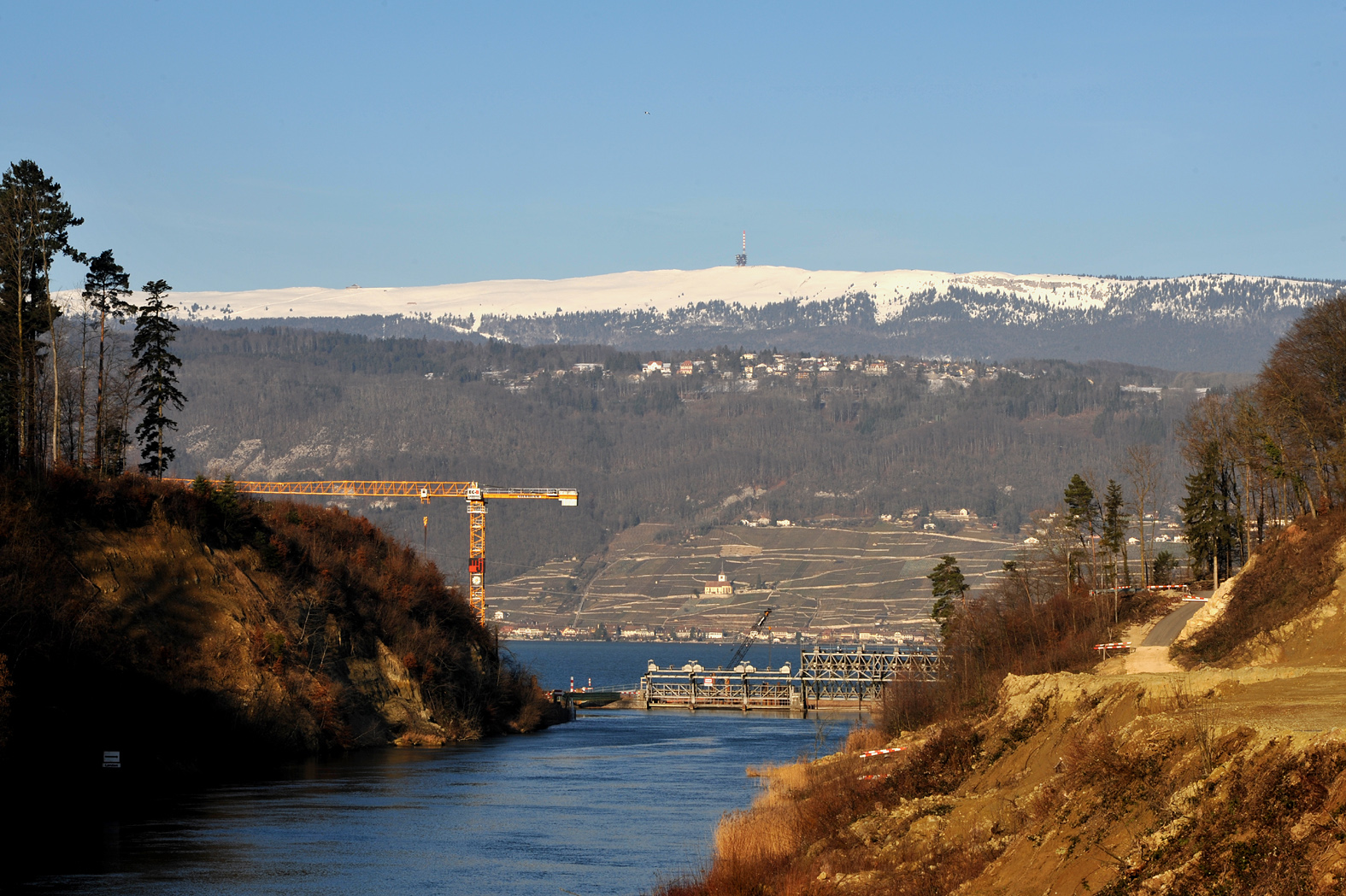
The Hagneck canal, looking away from Hagneck toward Lake Biel.

Hagneck is first mentioned in 1353 as Hagneg.

The small village of Hagnek was part of the parish of Täuffelen and the land was owned by the Counts of Neuchâtel-Nidau. Many of their estates, including Hagneck, were acquired by Bern in 1398. Under Bernese rule, the village was part of the Epsach quarter of the Vogtei of Nidau. Hagneck was quite small and in 1783 was listed as a farm with four houses. The Bernese patrician families of von Erlach and von May owned the fields and farms. Between 1873 and 1878 the Hagneck channel was built as part of the Jura water correction. The new channel began a process of draining the marshes and swamps near the village. In 1899 the Hagneck power station was built along with a canal to provide water for the station. A third project, between 1925 and 1937, drained many of the remaining marshes outside the village. The drainage projects opened up extensive farmland in the rich soil of the former marshes.

=== Today's Hagneck ===
The municipality was created in 1840, but remained tied to Täuffelen for the school and church. The construction of the Biel-Täuffelen-Ins railroad in 1916 connected the small village to the Swiss rail network. Today, agriculture, arts and crafts and the power plant employ a third of the population. The other two-thirds commute to jobs in the Biel/Bienne and Bern regions.

== Geography ==
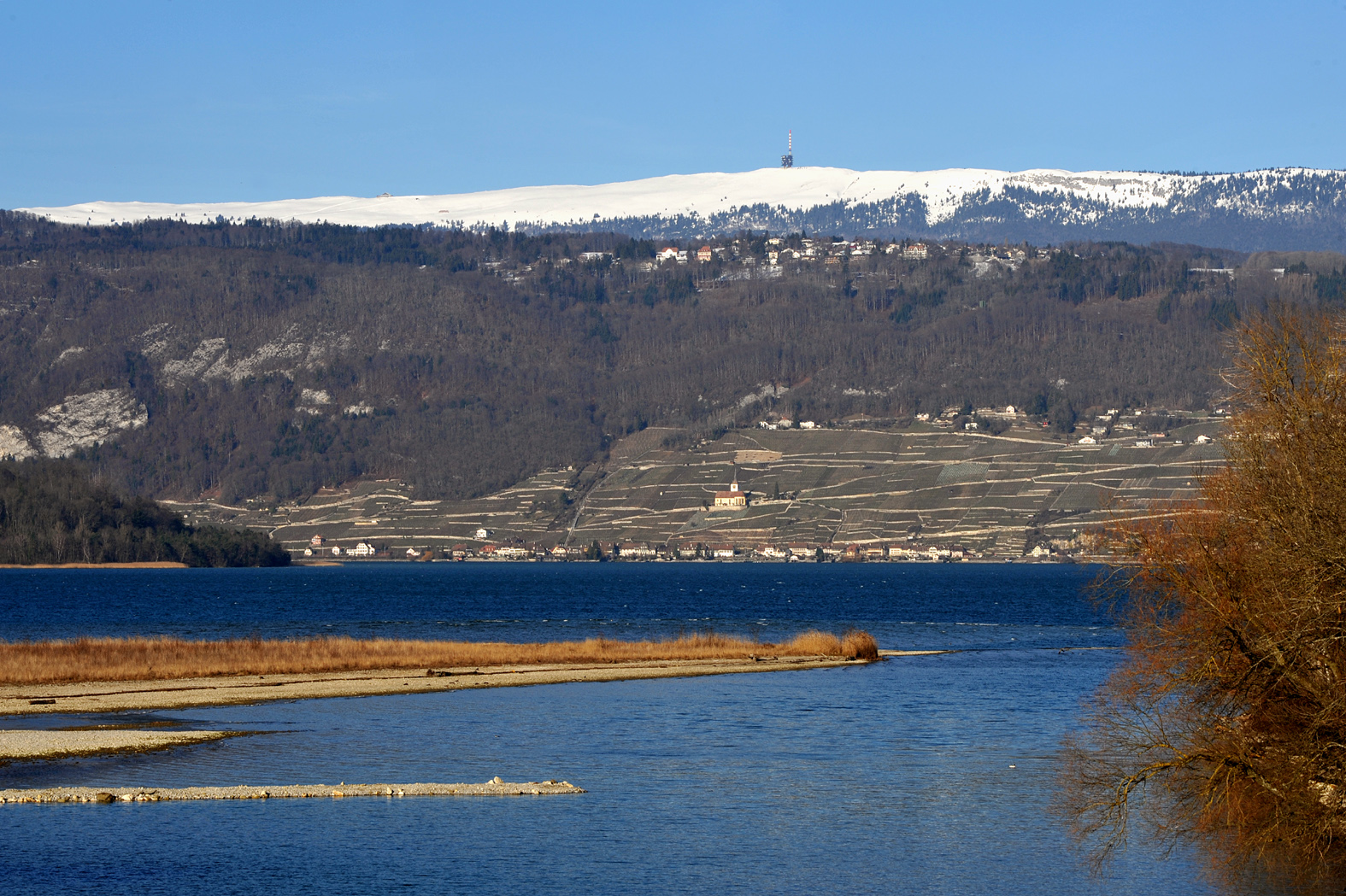
The mouth of the Hagneck canal into Lake Biel

Aerial view (1968)

Hagneck has an area of 1.84 km^{2} (0.71 sq mi). As of 2012, a total of 1.2 km^{2} (0.46 mi^{2}) or 65.6% is used for agricultural purposes, while 0.23 km^{2} (0.089 mi^{2}) or 12.6% is forested. Of the rest of the land, 0.23 km^{2} (0.089 mi^{2}) or 12.6% is settled (buildings or roads), 0.15 km^{2} (37 acres) or 8.2% is either rivers or lakes.

During the same year, housing and buildings made up 7.1% and transportation infrastructure made up 3.8%. Power and water infrastructure as well as other special developed areas made up 1.6% of the area Out of the forested land, 10.9% of the total land area is heavily forested and 1.6% is covered with orchards or small clusters of trees. Of the agricultural land, 59.0% is used for growing crops and 4.4% is pastures, while 2.2% is used for orchards or vine crops. All the water in the municipality is flowing water.

The village lies on the right bank of Biel/Bienne, at the mouth of the Hagneck canal, which was dug out as a main part of the Jura water correction, leading the Aare River into the lake.

On 31 December 2009 Amtsbezirk Nidau, the municipality's former district, was dissolved. On the following day, 1 January 2010, it joined the newly created Verwaltungskreis Seeland.

== Coat of arms ==
The blazon of the municipal coat of arms is Gules a Border Or and overall a Bendlet wavy Azure.

== Demographics ==
Hagneck has a population (as of December 2020) of 420. As of 2010, 4.5% of the population are resident foreign nationals. Over the last 10 years (2001-2011) the population has changed at a rate of -0.5%. Migration accounted for 0.2%, while births and deaths accounted for -0.7%.

Most of the population (as of 2000) speaks German (342 or 95.8%) as their first language, French is the second most common (11 or 3.1%) and Romansh is the third (1 or 0.3%).

As of 2008, the population was 49.2% male and 50.8% female. The population was made up of 198 Swiss men (47.3% of the population) and 8 (1.9%) non-Swiss men. There were 202 Swiss women (48.2%) and 1 (0.2%) non-Swiss women. Of the population in the municipality, 55 or about 15.4% were born in Hagneck and lived there in 2000. There were 193 or 54.1% who were born in the same canton, while 78 or 21.8% were born somewhere else in Switzerland, and 24 or 6.7% were born outside of Switzerland.

As of 2011, children and teenagers (0–19 years old) make up 17.3% of the population, while adults (20–64 years old) make up 62.4% and seniors (over 64 years old) make up 20.4%.

As of 2000, there were 127 people who were single and never married in the municipality. There were 187 married individuals, 24 widows or widowers and 19 individuals who are divorced.

As of 2010, there were 36 households that consist of only one person and 6 households with five or more people. In 2000, a total of 133 apartments (89.9% of the total) were permanently occupied, while 9 apartments (6.1%) were seasonally occupied and 6 apartments (4.1%) were empty. The vacancy rate for the municipality, in 2012, was 1.68%. In 2011, single family homes made up 79.3% of the total housing in the municipality.

The historical population is given in the following chart:

== Sights ==
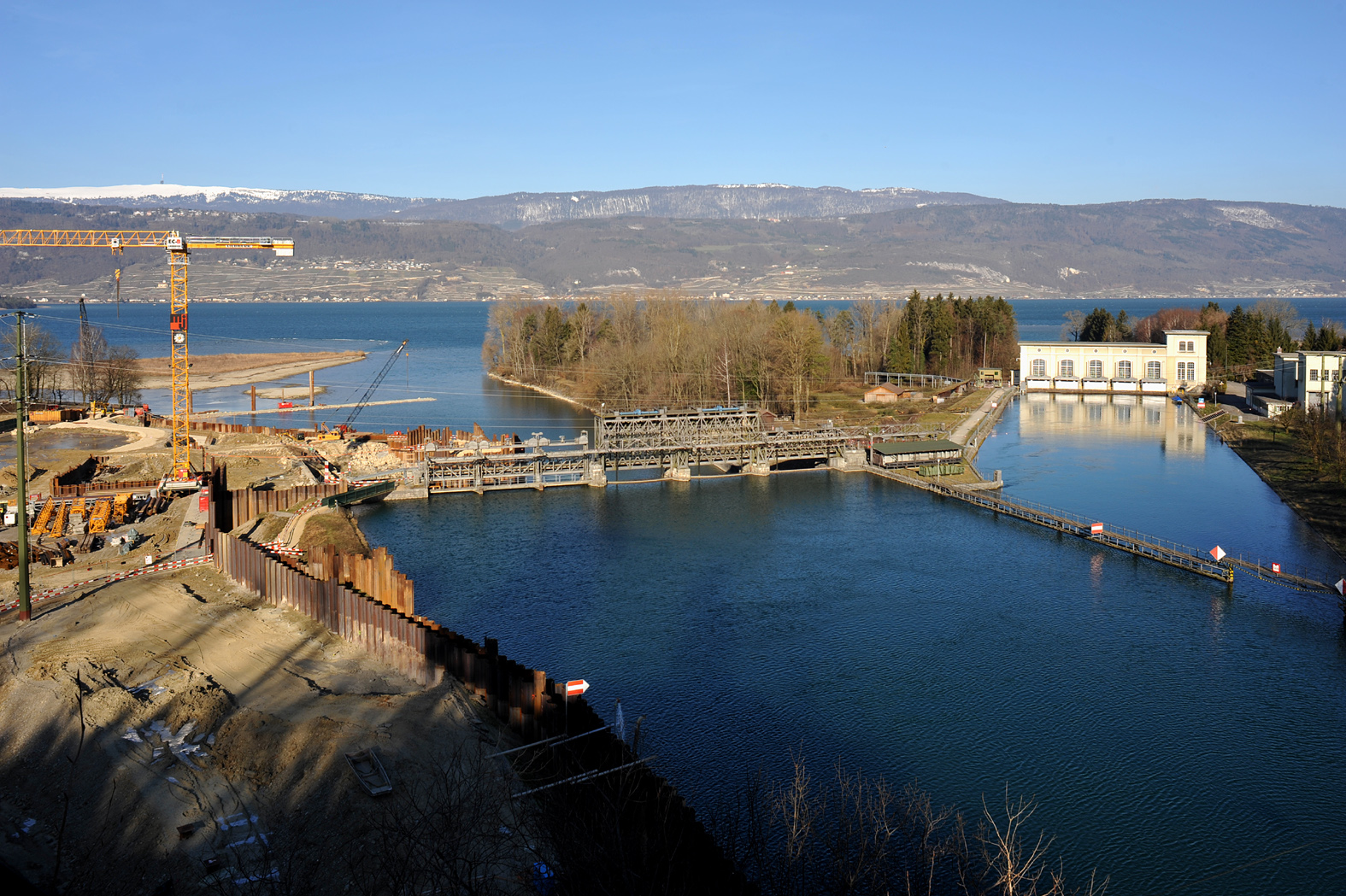
The Hagneck canal and the old hydroelectric power station.

The entire Elektrizitätswerk Hagneck (Hagneck Power Plant) site is designated as part of the Inventory of Swiss Heritage Sites.

== Politics ==
In the 2011 federal election the most popular party was the Swiss People's Party (SVP) which received 33% of the vote. The next three most popular parties were the Conservative Democratic Party (BDP) (20%), the Social Democratic Party (SP) (18.9%) and the Green Liberal Party (GLP) (7.9%). In the federal election, a total of 163 votes were cast, and the voter turnout was 47.4%.

== Economy ==
As of 2011, Hagneck had an unemployment rate of 2.2%. As of 2008, there were a total of 53 people employed in the municipality. Of these, there were 16 people employed in the primary economic sector and about 6 businesses involved in this sector. 13 people were employed in the secondary sector and there were 4 businesses in this sector. 24 people were employed in the tertiary sector, with 7 businesses in this sector. There were 180 residents of the municipality who were employed in some capacity, of which females made up 40.6% of the workforce.

In 2008 there were a total of 45 full-time equivalent jobs. The number of jobs in the primary sector was 13, all in agriculture. The number of jobs in the secondary sector was 11 of which 10 were in manufacturing and 1 was in construction. The number of jobs in the tertiary sector was 21. In the tertiary sector; 6 or 28.6% were in wholesale or retail sales or the repair of motor vehicles, 10 or 47.6% were in a hotel or restaurant, 1 was the insurance or financial industry, and 2 or 9.5% were technical professionals or scientists.

In 2000, there were 19 workers who commuted into the municipality and 153 workers who commuted away. The municipality is a net exporter of workers, with about 8.1 workers leaving the municipality for every one entering. A total of 27 workers (58.7% of the 46 total workers in the municipality) both lived and worked in Hagneck. Of the working population, 21.1% used public transportation to get to work, and 53.9% used a private car.

In 2011 the average local and cantonal tax rate on a married resident, with two children, of Hagneck making 150,000 CHF was 12.6%, while an unmarried resident's rate was 18.5%. For comparison, the rate for the entire canton in the same year, was 14.2% and 22.0%, while the nationwide rate was 12.3% and 21.1% respectively. In 2009 there were a total of 193 tax payers in the municipality. Of that total, 73 made over 75,000 CHF per year. There was one person who made between 15,000 and 20,000 per year. The average income of the over 75,000 CHF group in Hagneck was 102,918 CHF, while the average across all of Switzerland was 130,478 CHF.

In 2011 a total of 1.4% of the population received direct financial assistance from the government.

== Religion ==
From the 2000 census, 272 or 76.2% belonged to the Swiss Reformed Church, while 36 or 10.1% were Roman Catholic. Of the rest of the population, there were 10 individuals (or about 2.80% of the population) who belonged to another Christian church. There was 1 person who was Hindu and 1 individual who belonged to another church. 26 (or about 7.28% of the population) belonged to no church, are agnostic or atheist, and 11 individuals (or about 3.08% of the population) did not answer the question.

== Education ==
In Hagneck about 66.3% of the population have completed non-mandatory upper secondary education, and 14.1% have completed additional higher education (either university or a Fachhochschule). Of the 33 who had completed some form of tertiary schooling listed in the census, 69.7% were Swiss men, 24.2% were Swiss women.

As of 2000, there was 1 student who lived in Hagneck and attended a school in the municipality. 53 students from Hagneck attended schools outside the municipality.

== Bibliography ==
-P. Aeschbacher, Stadt und von den Landvogtei Nidau Anfängen bis ins 16. Jh., 1929 Gesamtmelioration-Brüttelen-Lüscherz-Hagneck, 1970–1987, 1989
