= Täuffelen =

- Municipality
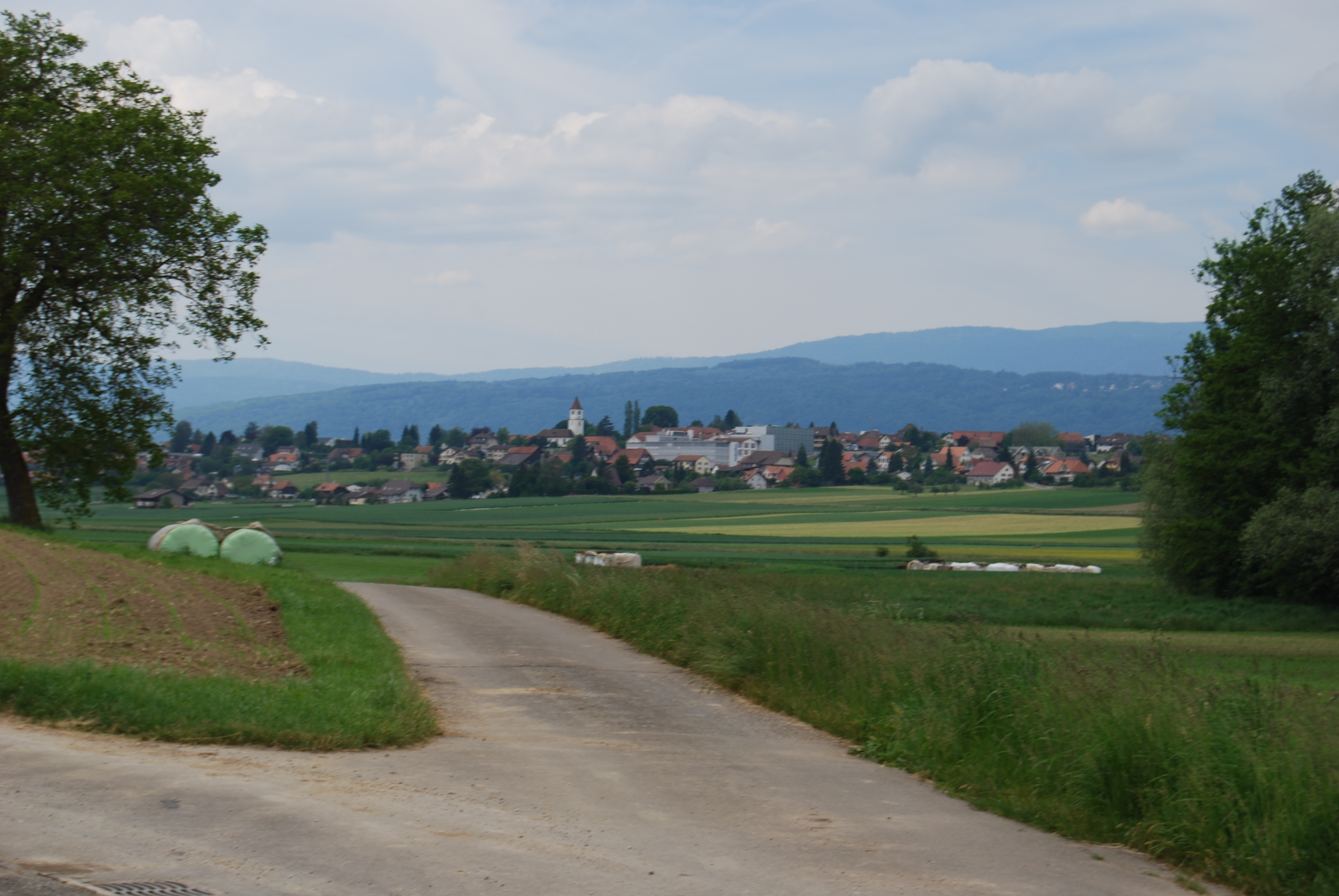

- Flag Coat of arms
- Location of Täuffelen
- Location within Switzerland Location within Canton of Bern
- Coordinates: 47°4′N 7°12′E
- Country: Switzerland
- Canton: Bern
- District: Seeland

Area
  - Total: 4.4 km^{2} (1.7 sq mi)
- Elevation: 492 m (1,614 ft)

Population (Dec 2020)
  - Total: 2,976
  - Density: 680/km^{2} (1,800/sq mi)
- Time zone: UTC+01:00 (CET)
  - Summer (DST): UTC+02:00 (CEST)
- Postal code: 2575
- SFOS number: 751
- ISO 3166 code: CH-BE
- Surrounded by: Epsach, Hagneck, Ligerz, Mörigen, Twann, Walperswil
- Website: www.taeuffelen.ch

Täuffelen is a municipality in the Seeland administrative district in the canton of Bern in Switzerland.

== History ==
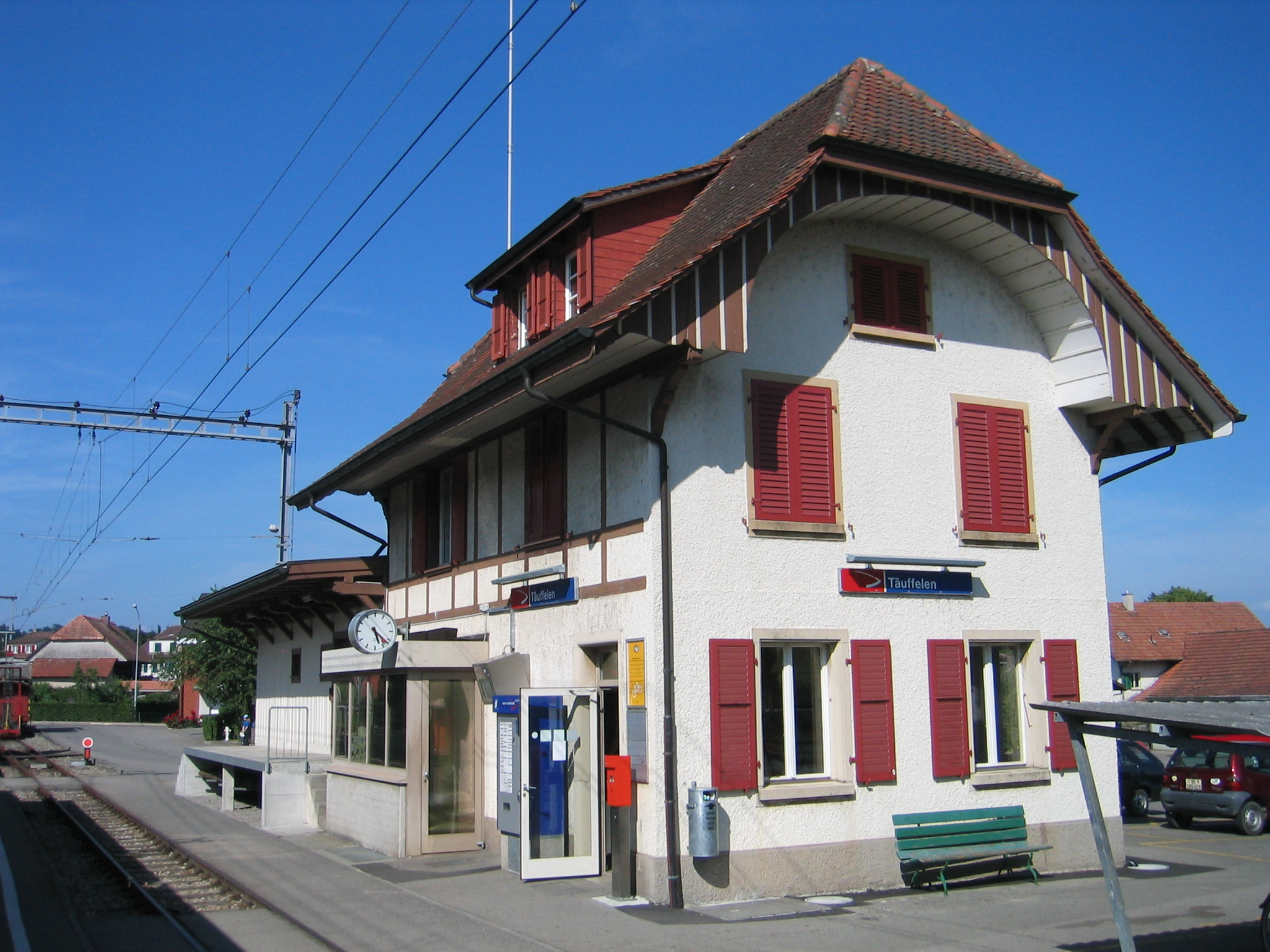
Täuffelen railroad station

Täuffelen is first mentioned in 1228 as Choufalli. In 1280 it was mentioned as Tofallie.

The lake shore was inhabited during the Neolithic and Late Bronze Age. In addition, prehistoric artifacts have been found in the Täuffelenmoos bogs near the modern village. Both Täuffelen and Gerolfingen grew out of celtic villages. During the Middle Ages Täuffelen village was initially probably part of the Barony of Walperswil. In 1247 it was inherited by the Count of Neuchâtel-Nidau. The Counts held it for about a century and a half, until 1398, when Bern acquired the entire Inselgau, including Täuffelen. Under Bernese rule, Täuffelen, Gerolfingen, Hagneck and Epsach were combined into the Epsachviertel (Epsach Quarter) of the Bailiwick of Nidau. Following the 1798 French invasion, Sutz-Lattrigen became part of the Helvetic Republic district of Seeland. With the 1803 Act of Mediation it became part of the district of Nidau.

The village church of St. Peter and Paul was first mentioned in 1228. However, it was probably built on the ruins of an earlier Roman era settlement. The nave is built in an earlier Romanesque style. The church's Barbara Altar became the center of a regional religious fraternity. In 1528 Bern adopted the new faith of the Protestant Reformation as did all of its lands, including Täuffelen. Today the parish includes the villages of Epsach, Hagneck, Hermrigen and Mörigen. The local Catholic church was built in 1971-72.

Gerolfingen village had a harbor on the lake and was a local trading and fishing center. The residents of Täuffelen grew crops, cared for vineyards on the hill below the church and fished in the lake. The first industrial factory opened in Täuffelen in 1846 and began to change the character of the village. This first factory, which manufactured watch and clock parts, was followed by several other factories. The Jura water correction projects and the construction of the Aarberg-Hagneck Canal between 1868 and 1880 opened up new land around the villages and removed the threat of flooding. In 1916 the growing village was connected to the Biel-Täuffelen-Ins (BTI) railroad. In 1944 the BTI established their headquarters in Täuffelen. While industry grew in the village, cherry orchards flourished in the farm land around it. In 1950 a secondary school opened in the municipality, which brought in students from surrounding communities.

== Geography ==
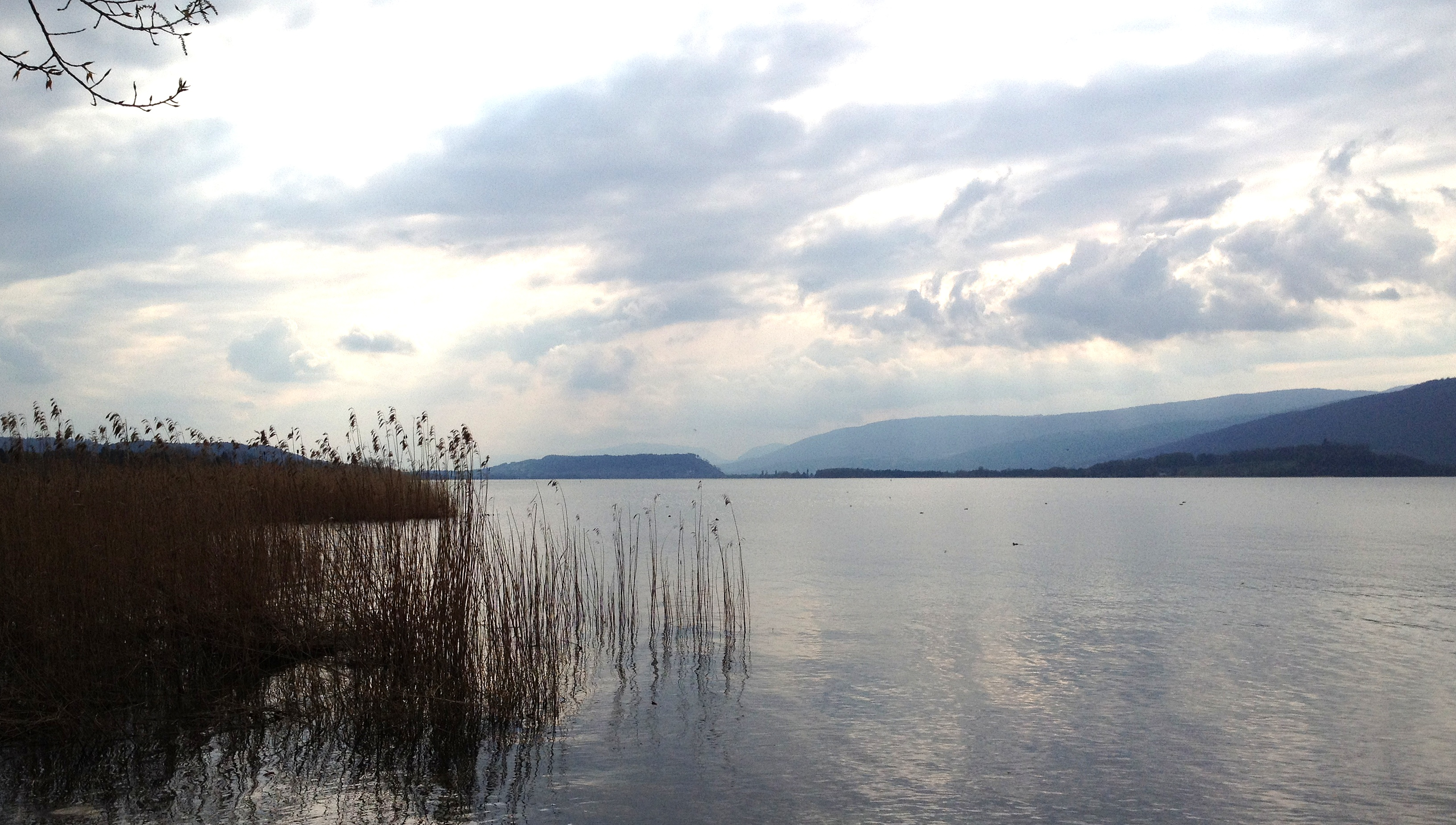
Lake Biel at the Hagneck Canal in Gerolfingen

Aerial view (1954)

Täuffelen has an area of 4.37 km^{2} (1.69 sq mi). As of 2012, a total of 2.63 km^{2} (1.02 mi^{2}) or 59.8% is used for agricultural purposes, while 0.47 km^{2} (0.18 mi^{2}) or 10.7% is forested. The rest of the municipality is 1.03 km^{2} (0.40 mi^{2}) or 23.4% is settled (buildings or roads), 0.08 km^{2} (20 acres) or 1.8% is either rivers or lakes and 0.19 km^{2} (0.073 mi^{2}) or 4.3% is unproductive land.

During the same year, industrial buildings made up 1.1% of the total area while housing and buildings made up 14.5% and transportation infrastructure made up 5.7%. while parks, green belts and sports fields made up 1.4%. A total of 9.3% of the total land area is heavily forested and 1.4% is covered with orchards or small clusters of trees. Of the agricultural land, 43.6% is used for growing crops and 8.6% is pasturage, while 7.5% is used for orchards or vine crops. Of the water in the municipality, 0.2% is in lakes and 1.6% is in rivers and streams.

The municipality is located on the right bank of Lake Biel. It consists of the villages of Täuffelen and Gerolfingen.

On 31 December 2009 Amtsbezirk Nidau, the municipality's former district, was dissolved. On the following day, 1 January 2010, it joined the newly created Verwaltungskreis Seeland.

== Coat of arms ==
The blazon of the municipal coat of arms is Azure a Cypher TF Argent and a Border Or.

== Demographics ==
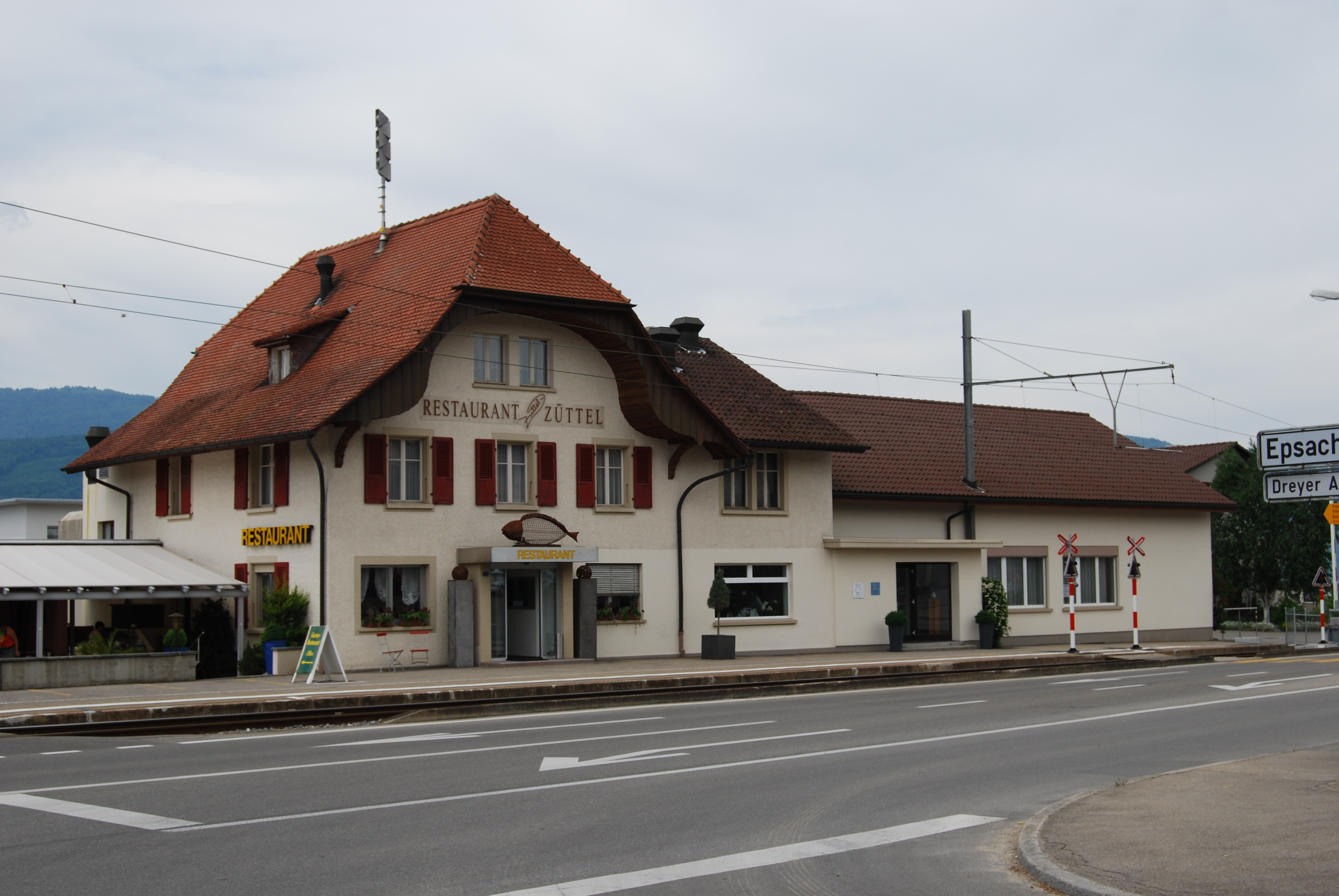
Züttel Restaurant in Gerolfingen village

Täuffelen has a population (as of December 2020) of 2,971. As of 2010, 5.8% of the population are resident foreign nationals. Over the last 10 years (2001-2011) the population has changed at a rate of -0.2%. Migration accounted for -0.4%, while births and deaths accounted for 0.1%.

Most of the population (as of 2000) speaks German (2,221 or 91.1%) as their first language, French is the second most common (81 or 3.3%) and Albanian is the third (39 or 1.6%). There are 32 people who speak Italian and 2 people who speak Romansh.

As of 2008, the population was 48.6% male and 51.4% female. The population was made up of 1,194 Swiss men (45.6% of the population) and 77 (2.9%) non-Swiss men. There were 1,272 Swiss women (48.6%) and 74 (2.8%) non-Swiss women. Of the population in the municipality, 631 or about 25.9% were born in Täuffelen and lived there in 2000. There were 1,108 or 45.5% who were born in the same canton, while 404 or 16.6% were born somewhere else in Switzerland, and 240 or 9.8% were born outside of Switzerland.

As of 2011, children and teenagers (0–19 years old) make up 18.8% of the population, while adults (20–64 years old) make up 60.2% and seniors (over 64 years old) make up 20.9%.

As of 2000, there were 884 people who were single and never married in the municipality. There were 1,262 married individuals, 157 widows or widowers and 134 individuals who are divorced.

As of 2010, there were 321 households that consist of only one person and 47 households with five or more people. In 2000, a total of 1,012 apartments (91.6% of the total) were permanently occupied, while 63 apartments (5.7%) were seasonally occupied and 30 apartments (2.7%) were empty. As of 2010, the construction rate of new housing units was 5 new units per 1000 residents. The vacancy rate for the municipality, in 2012, was 1.81%. In 2011, single family homes made up 61.5% of the total housing in the municipality.

The historical population is given in the following chart:

== Politics ==
In the 2011 federal election the most popular party was the Swiss People's Party (SVP) which received 33% of the vote. The next three most popular parties were the Social Democratic Party (SP) (18.9%), the Conservative Democratic Party (BDP) (17.8%) and the FDP.The Liberals (10.2%). In the federal election, a total of 946 votes were cast, and the voter turnout was 46.4%.

== Transport ==
Motorway entrances: 10 km to Brügg, 15 km to Kerzers, 12 km to Lyss

Airport: 48 min. By car to Bern-Belpmoos, 93 min. By car to Zurich-Kloten

Public transport: Biel-Täuffelen-Ins railway line (asm / Aare Seeland mobil AG), WETA bus Aarberg-Täuffelen (see links)

Approval for access to the lake: In contrast to other lakeside communities, Täuffelen-Gerolfingen is only looking for gentle tourism. Access to the lake for motor vehicles requires a permit. Residents receive a permit for CHF 10.00, which is valid for two years and allows parking in the official parking lot by the lake.

== Economy ==
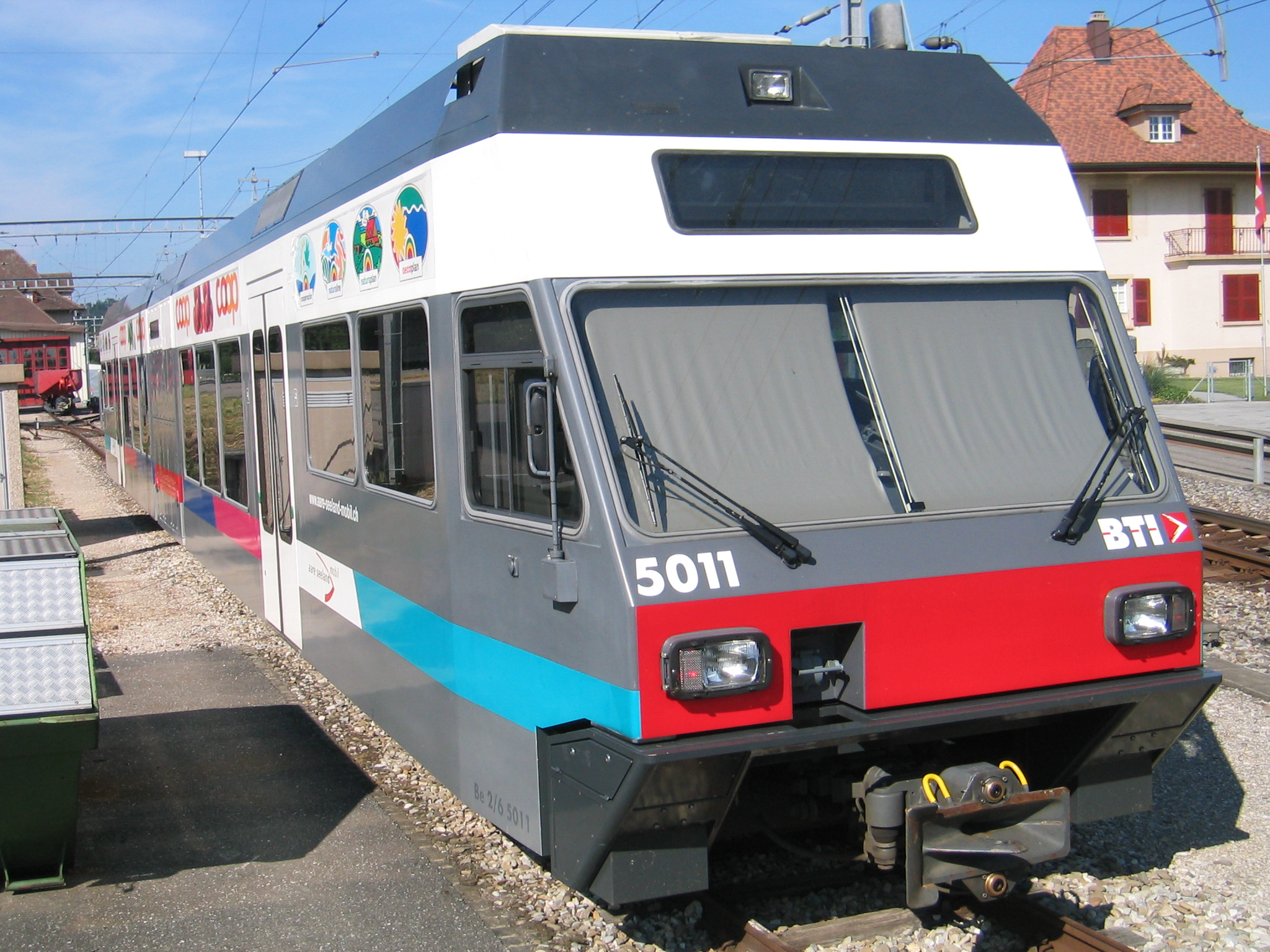
Aare Seeland mobil (ASM) train at Täuffelen

As of 2011, Täuffelen had an unemployment rate of 1.46%. As of 2008, there were a total of 1,039 people employed in the municipality. Of these, there were 72 people employed in the primary economic sector and about 18 businesses involved in this sector. 584 people were employed in the secondary sector and there were 32 businesses in this sector. 383 people were employed in the tertiary sector, with 64 businesses in this sector. There were 1,352 residents of the municipality who were employed in some capacity, of which females made up 42.5% of the workforce.

In 2008 there were a total of 893 full-time equivalent jobs. The number of jobs in the primary sector was 51, of which 47 were in agriculture and 4 were in fishing or fisheries. The number of jobs in the secondary sector was 551 of which 498 or (90.4%) were in manufacturing and 51 (9.3%) were in construction. The number of jobs in the tertiary sector was 291. In the tertiary sector; 70 or 24.1% were in wholesale or retail sales or the repair of motor vehicles, 55 or 18.9% were in the movement and storage of goods, 19 or 6.5% were in a hotel or restaurant, 26 or 8.9% were technical professionals or scientists, 25 or 8.6% were in education and 51 or 17.5% were in health care.

In 2000, there were 497 workers who commuted into the municipality and 846 workers who commuted away. The municipality is a net exporter of workers, with about 1.7 workers leaving the municipality for every one entering. A total of 505 workers (50.4% of the 1,002 total workers in the municipality) both lived and worked in Täuffelen. Of the working population, 16.3% used public transportation to get to work, and 51.1% used a private car.

In 2011 the average local and cantonal tax rate on a married resident, with two children, of Täuffelen making 150,000 CHF was 11.7%, while an unmarried resident's rate was 17.2%. For comparison, the average rate for the entire canton in the same year, was 14.2% and 22.0%, while the nationwide average was 12.3% and 21.1% respectively. In 2009 there were a total of 1,226 tax payers in the municipality. Of that total, 472 made over 75,000 CHF per year. There were 7 people who made between 15,000 and 20,000 per year. The average income of the over 75,000 CHF group in Täuffelen was 119,026 CHF, while the average across all of Switzerland was 130,478 CHF.

In 2011 a total of 2.0% of the population received direct financial assistance from the government.

== Religion ==
From the 2000 census, 1,779 or 73.0% belonged to the Swiss Reformed Church, while 338 or 13.9% were Roman Catholic. Of the rest of the population, there were 7 members of an Orthodox church (or about 0.29% of the population), there were 2 individuals (or about 0.08% of the population) who belonged to the Christian Catholic Church, and there were 29 individuals (or about 1.19% of the population) who belonged to another Christian church. There were 3 individuals (or about 0.12% of the population) who were Jewish, and 54 (or about 2.22% of the population) who were Islamic. There were 5 individuals who were Buddhist, 1 person who was Hindu and 1 individual who belonged to another church. 171 (or about 7.02% of the population) belonged to no church, are agnostic or atheist, and 47 individuals (or about 1.93% of the population) did not answer the question.

== Education ==
In Täuffelen about 59.2% of the population have completed non-mandatory upper secondary education, and 21.5% have completed additional higher education (either university or a Fachhochschule). Of the 350 who had completed some form of tertiary schooling listed in the census, 74.9% were Swiss men, 18.6% were Swiss women, 4.9% were non-Swiss men and 1.7% were non-Swiss women.

The Canton of Bern school system provides one year of non-obligatory Kindergarten, followed by six years of Primary school. This is followed by three years of obligatory lower Secondary school where the students are separated according to ability and aptitude. Following the lower Secondary students may attend additional schooling or they may enter an apprenticeship.

During the 2011-12 school year, there were a total of 389 students attending classes in Täuffelen. There were 2 kindergarten classes with a total of 39 students in the municipality. Of the kindergarten students, 7.7% were permanent or temporary residents of Switzerland (not citizens). The municipality had 9 primary classes and 181 students. Of the primary students, 2.8% were permanent or temporary residents of Switzerland (not citizens) and 2.8% have a different mother language than the classroom language. During the same year, there were 9 lower secondary classes with a total of 169 students. There were 4.1% who were permanent or temporary residents of Switzerland (not citizens) and 10.1% have a different mother language than the classroom language.

As of 2000, there were a total of 383 students attending any school in the municipality. Of those, 260 both lived and attended school in the municipality, while 123 students came from another municipality. During the same year, 70 residents attended schools outside the municipality.

Täuffelen is home to the Gemeindebibliothek Täuffelen-Gerolfingen (municipal library of Täuffelen) which is located in the local schoolhouse. The library has (as of 2008) 3,000 books or other media, and loaned out 7,190 items in the same year. It was open a total of 133 days with average of 6 hours per week during that year.

The schoolhouse also has rooms and infrastructure that are important for culture, clubs and leisure activities in the region: indoor swimming pool, auditorium, kitchen, multi-purpose hall, emergency shelter and soccer field.
