= Walperswil =

- Municipality
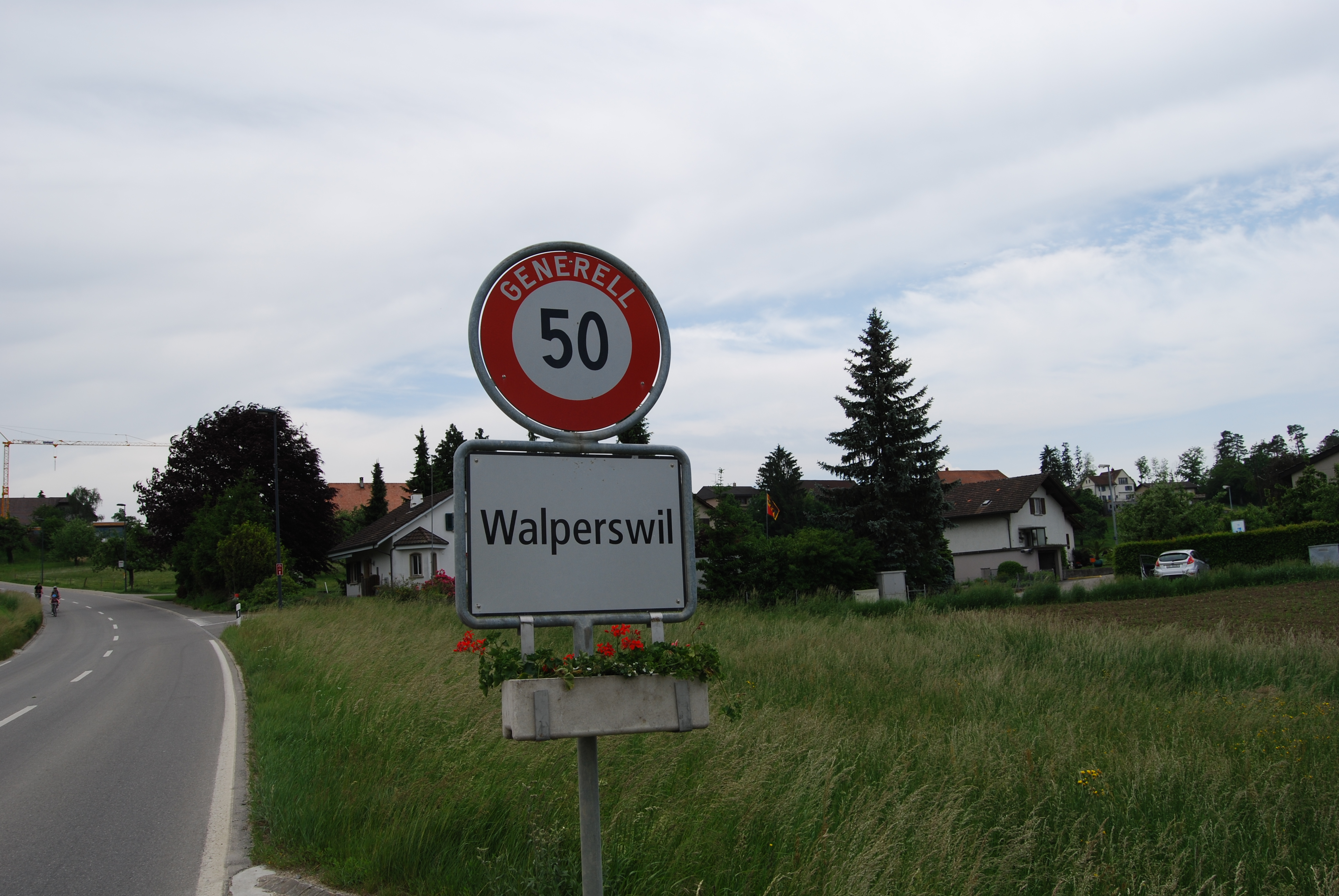

- Flag Coat of arms
- Location of Walperswil
- Location within Switzerland Location within Canton of Bern
- Coordinates: 47°4′N 7°14′E
- Country: Switzerland
- Canton: Bern
- District: Seeland

Area
  - Total: 7.0 km^{2} (2.7 sq mi)
- Elevation: 468 m (1,535 ft)

Population (Dec 2011)
  - Total: 923
  - Density: 130/km^{2} (340/sq mi)
- Time zone: UTC+01:00 (CET)
  - Summer (DST): UTC+02:00 (CEST)
- Postal code: 3272
- SFOS number: 754
- ISO 3166 code: CH-BE
- Surrounded by: Bargen, Bühl, Epsach, Hagneck, Kappelen, Siselen, Täuffelen
- Website: www.walperswil.ch

Walperswil is a municipality in the Seeland administrative district in the canton of Bern in Switzerland.

== History ==
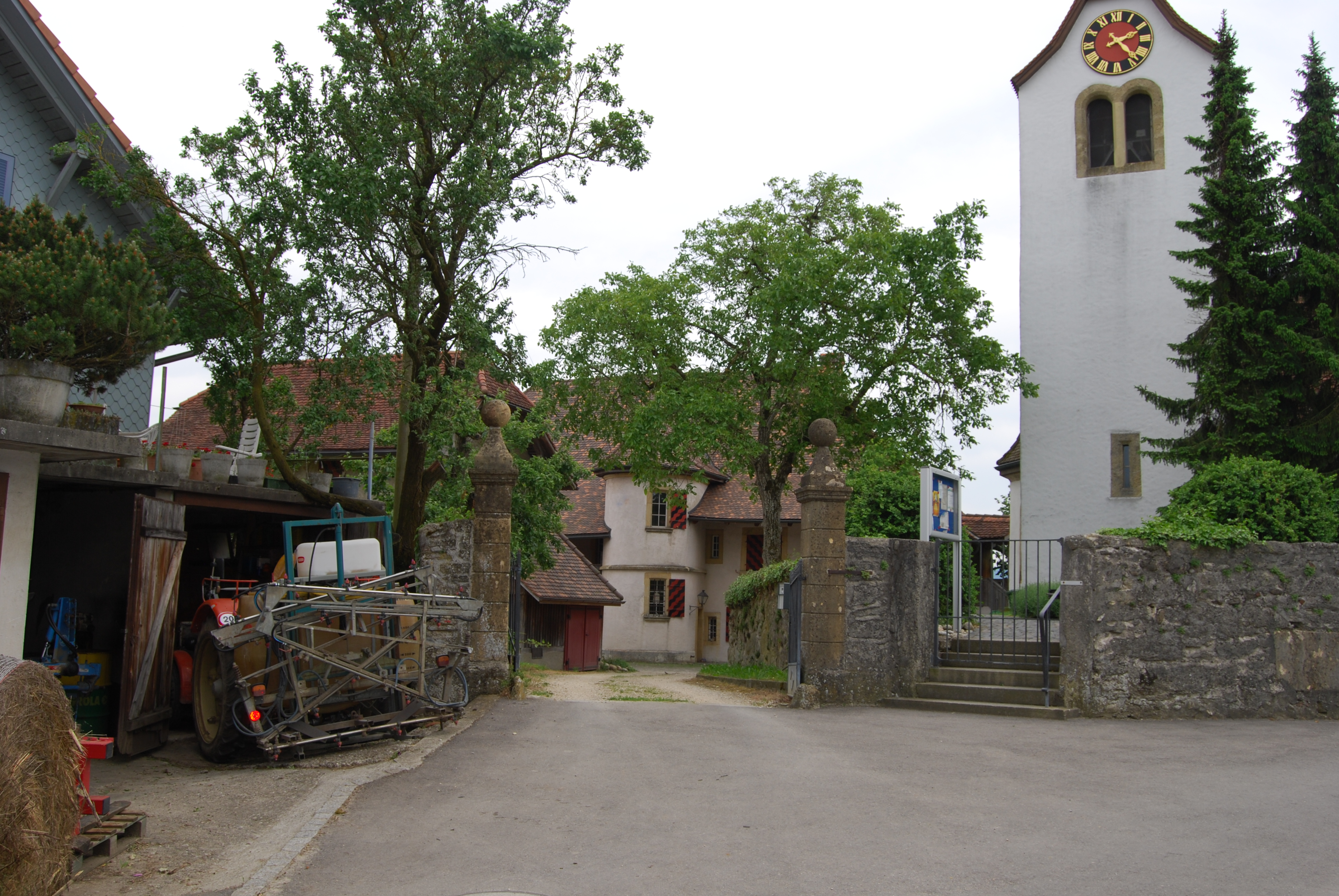
The village church and rectory

Aerial view (1954)

Walperswil is first mentioned in 1225 as Walperssuivile. In 1247 it was mentioned as Walbervilar.

The oldest trace of a settlement in the area is the old Grosses Moos Roman road which runs through the municipality. During the Middle Ages the village was owned by the Freiherr von Walperswil. In 1247, it was acquired by the Counts of Neuchâtel-Nidau. In 1398, the entire Inselgau, including Walperswil, was acquired by the city of Bern. The Jura water correction projects of 1868 to 1890 helped drain some of the marshes around Walperswil and opened up some farm land. In 1925-37 and 1966–78, additional drainage projects opened more farm land around the village. Today, much of the arable land in the municipality is used to raise strawberries. About two-thirds of the working population commute to nearby cities and towns for work.

The village church of St. Andreas, St. Margareth and St. Petronella was first mentioned in 1228. However, the first church on that site was probably built in the 9th century. The 13th century church was rebuilt in the second half of the 15th century. In 1528, Bern adopted the new faith of the Protestant Reformation and Walperswil converted with the rest of Bern's lands. Walperswil and the neighboring village of Bühl form a parish.

== Geography ==
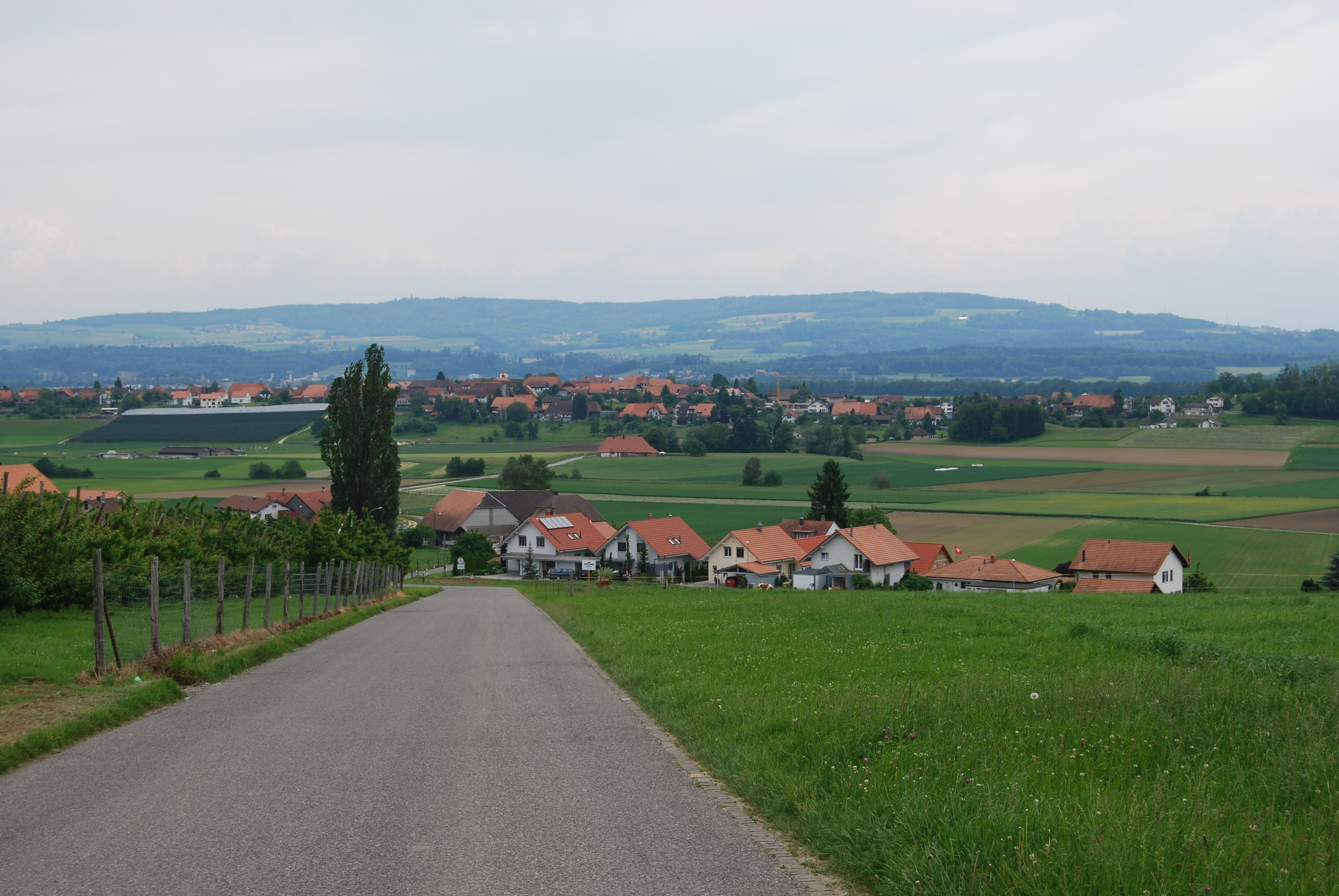
Epsach and Walperswil villages

Walperswil has an area of 6.96 km^{2} (2.69 sq mi). As of 2012, a total of 5.37 km^{2} (2.07 mi^{2}) or 77.2% is used for agricultural purposes, while 0.54 km^{2} (0.21 mi^{2}) or 7.8% is forested. The rest of the municipality is 0.67 km^{2} (0.26 mi^{2}) or 9.6% is settled (buildings or roads), 0.41 km^{2} (0.16 mi^{2}) or 5.9% is either rivers or lakes.

During the same year, housing and buildings made up 4.3% and transportation infrastructure made up 2.7%. Power and water infrastructure as well as other special developed areas made up 1.4% of the area All of the forested land area is covered with heavy forests. Of the agricultural land, 70.5% is used for growing crops and 4.2% is pasturage, while 2.4% is used for orchards or vine crops. All the water in the municipality is flowing water.

The municipality is located on a moraine between the Seeland region and Lake Biel. It consists of the village of Walperswil and the hamlet of Gimmiz.

On 31 December 2009, Amtsbezirk Nidau, the municipality's former district, was dissolved. On the following day, 1 January 2010, it joined the newly created Verwaltungskreis Seeland.

== Coat of arms ==
The blazon of the municipal coat of arms is Azure a Letter W Argent between two Grapes Or in pale.

== Demographics ==
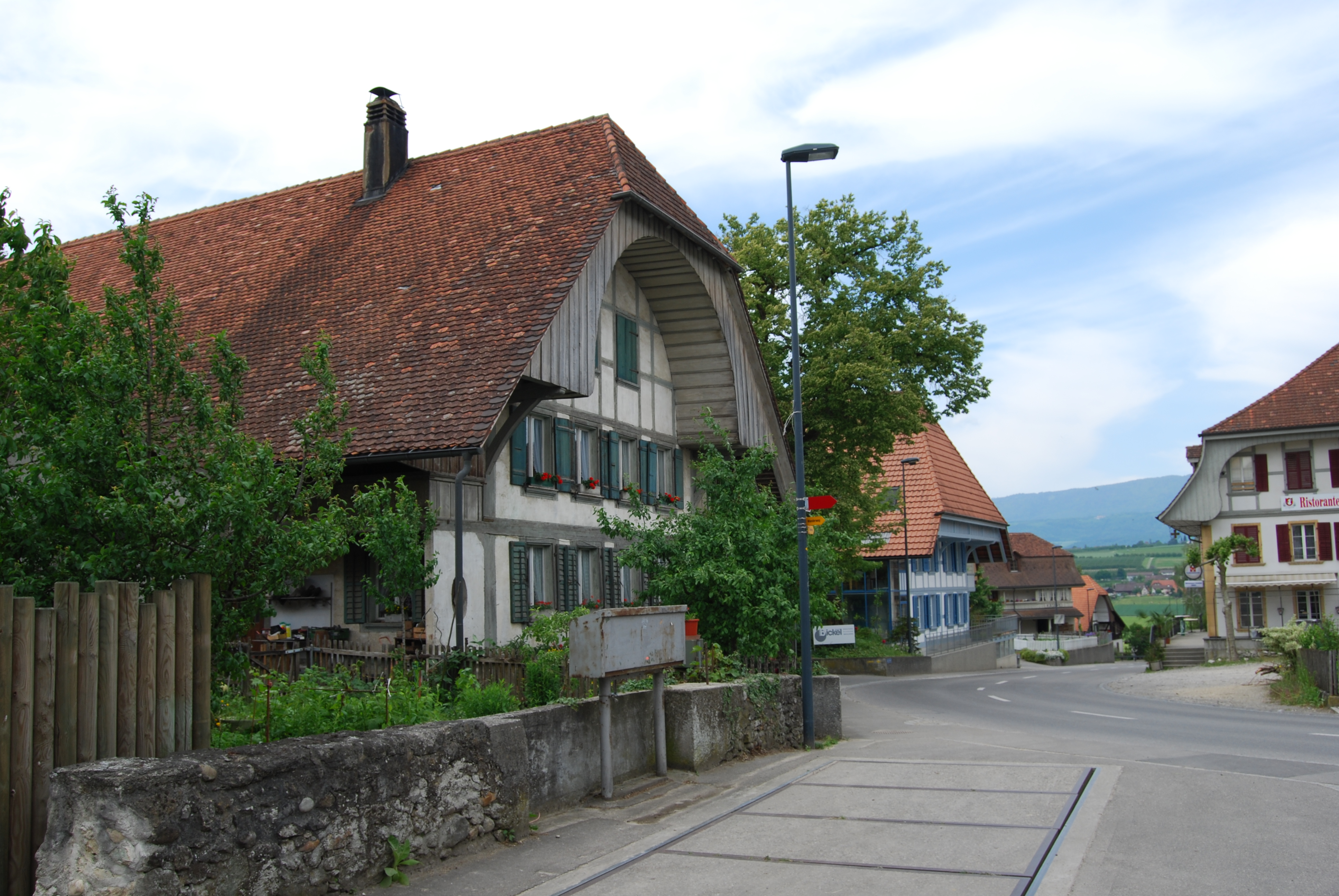
Walperswil village

Walperswil has a population (as of December 2020) of 1,039. As of 2010, 3.3% of the population are resident foreign nationals. Over the last 10 years (2001-2011) the population has changed at a rate of 0.5%. Migration accounted for 0.3%, while births and deaths accounted for 0.1%.

Most of the population (as of 2000) speaks German (759 or 96.3%) as their first language, Albanian is the second most common (8 or 1.0%) and French is the third (7 or 0.9%). There are 3 people who speak Italian.

As of 2008, the population was 50.0% male and 50.0% female. The population was made up of 446 Swiss men (48.6% of the population) and 13 (1.4%) non-Swiss men. There were 442 Swiss women (48.1%) and 17 (1.9%) non-Swiss women. Of the population in the municipality, 311 or about 39.5% were born in Walperswil and lived there in 2000. There were 355 or 45.1% who were born in the same canton, while 58 or 7.4% were born somewhere else in Switzerland, and 39 or 4.9% were born outside of Switzerland.

As of 2011, children and teenagers (0–19 years old) make up 23.2% of the population, while adults (20–64 years old) make up 60.8% and seniors (over 64 years old) make up 16%.

As of 2000, there were 293 people who were single and never married in the municipality. There were 418 married individuals, 51 widows or widowers and 26 individuals who are divorced.

As of 2010, there were 80 households that consist of only one person and 22 households with five or more people. In 2000, a total of 314 apartments (95.4% of the total) were permanently occupied, while 10 apartments (3.0%) were seasonally occupied and 5 apartments (1.5%) were empty. As of 2010, the construction rate of new housing units was 8.7 new units per 1000 residents. The vacancy rate for the municipality, in 2012, was 0.25%. In 2011, single family homes made up 58.8% of the total housing in the municipality.

The historical population is given in the following chart:

== Heritage sites of national significance ==
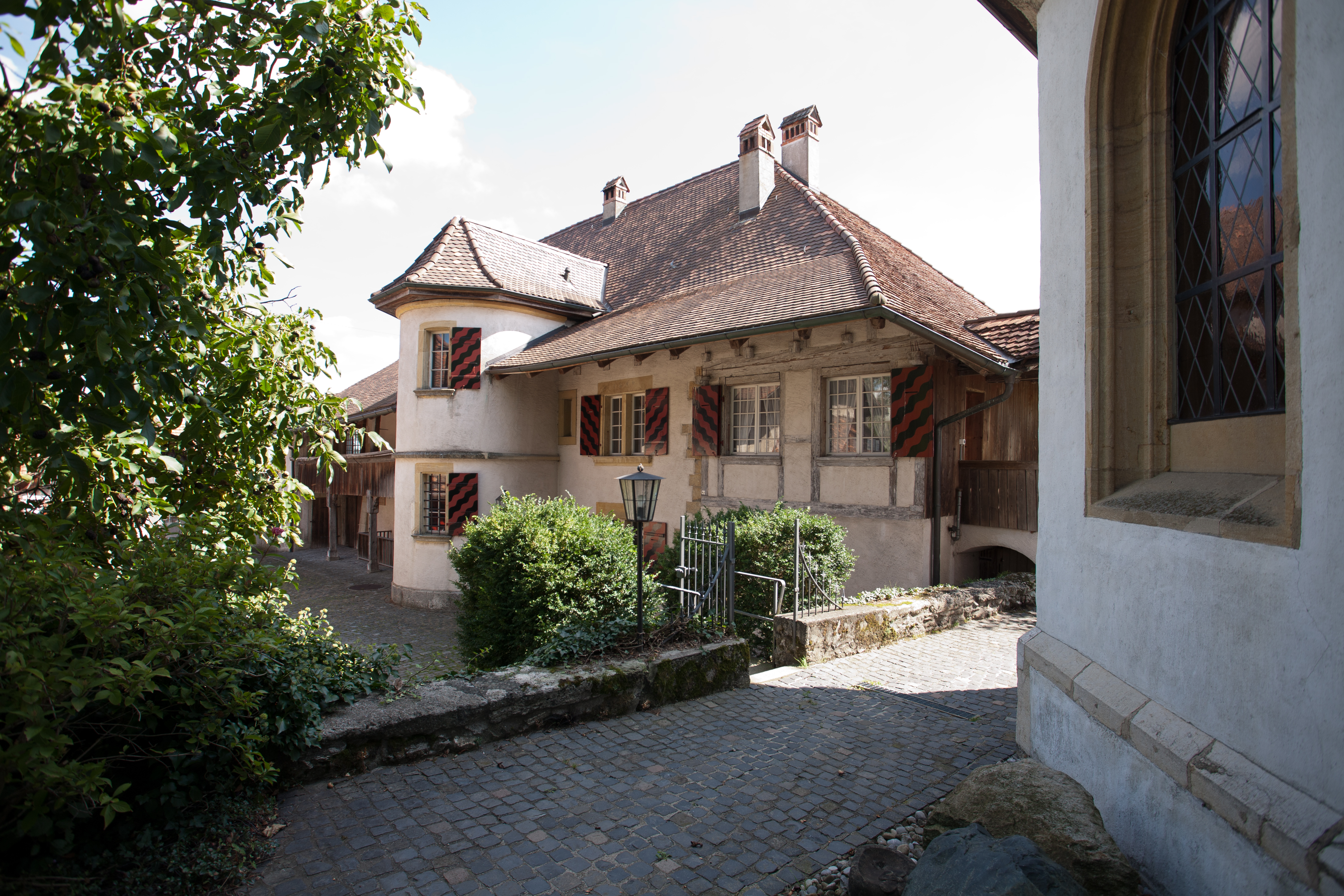
Walperswil village rectory

The village rectory is listed as a Swiss heritage site of national significance. The entire village of Walperswil is part of the Inventory of Swiss Heritage Sites.

== Politics ==
In the 2011 federal election, the most popular party was the Swiss People's Party (SVP) which received 40.2% of the vote. The next three most popular parties were the Conservative Democratic Party (BDP) (23.4%), the Social Democratic Party (SP) (12.8%) and the Green Liberal Party (GLP) (6.4%). In the federal election, a total of 411 votes were cast, and the voter turnout was 56.9%.

== Economy ==
As of 2011, Walperswil had an unemployment rate of 1.26%. As of 2008, there were a total of 302 people employed in the municipality. Of these, there were 148 people employed in the primary economic sector and about 29 businesses involved in this sector. 38 people were employed in the secondary sector and there were 13 businesses in this sector. 116 people were employed in the tertiary sector, with 22 businesses in this sector. There were 441 residents of the municipality who were employed in some capacity, of which females made up 41.3% of the workforce.

In 2008, there were a total of 186 full-time equivalent jobs. The number of jobs in the primary sector was 74, all of which were in agriculture. The number of jobs in the secondary sector was 32 of which 4 or (12.5%) were in manufacturing and 28 (87.5%) were in construction. The number of jobs in the tertiary sector was 80. In the tertiary sector; 25 or 31.3% were in wholesale or retail sales or the repair of motor vehicles, 3 or 3.8% were in the movement and storage of goods, 6 or 7.5% were in a hotel or restaurant, 1 was in the information industry, 6 or 7.5% were technical professionals or scientists, 13 or 16.3% were in education and 7 or 8.8% were in health care.

In 2000, there were 47 workers who commuted into the municipality and 303 workers who commuted away. The municipality is a net exporter of workers, with about 6.4 workers leaving the municipality for every one entering. A total of 138 workers (74.6% of the 185 total workers in the municipality) both lived and worked in Walperswil. Of the working population, 6.3% used public transportation to get to work, and 61.9% used a private car.

In 2011 the average local and cantonal tax rate on a married resident, with two children, of Walperswil making 150,000 CHF was 13%, while an unmarried resident's rate was 19.1%. For comparison, the average rate for the entire canton in the same year, was 14.2% and 22.0%, while the nationwide average was 12.3% and 21.1% respectively. In 2009, there were a total of 398 tax payers in the municipality. Of that total, 126 made over 75,000 CHF per year. There were 6 people who made between 15,000 and 20,000 per year. The average income of the over 75,000 CHF group in Walperswil was 114,456 CHF, while the average across all of Switzerland was 130,478 CHF.

In 2011, a total of 1.7% of the population received direct financial assistance from the government.

== Religion ==
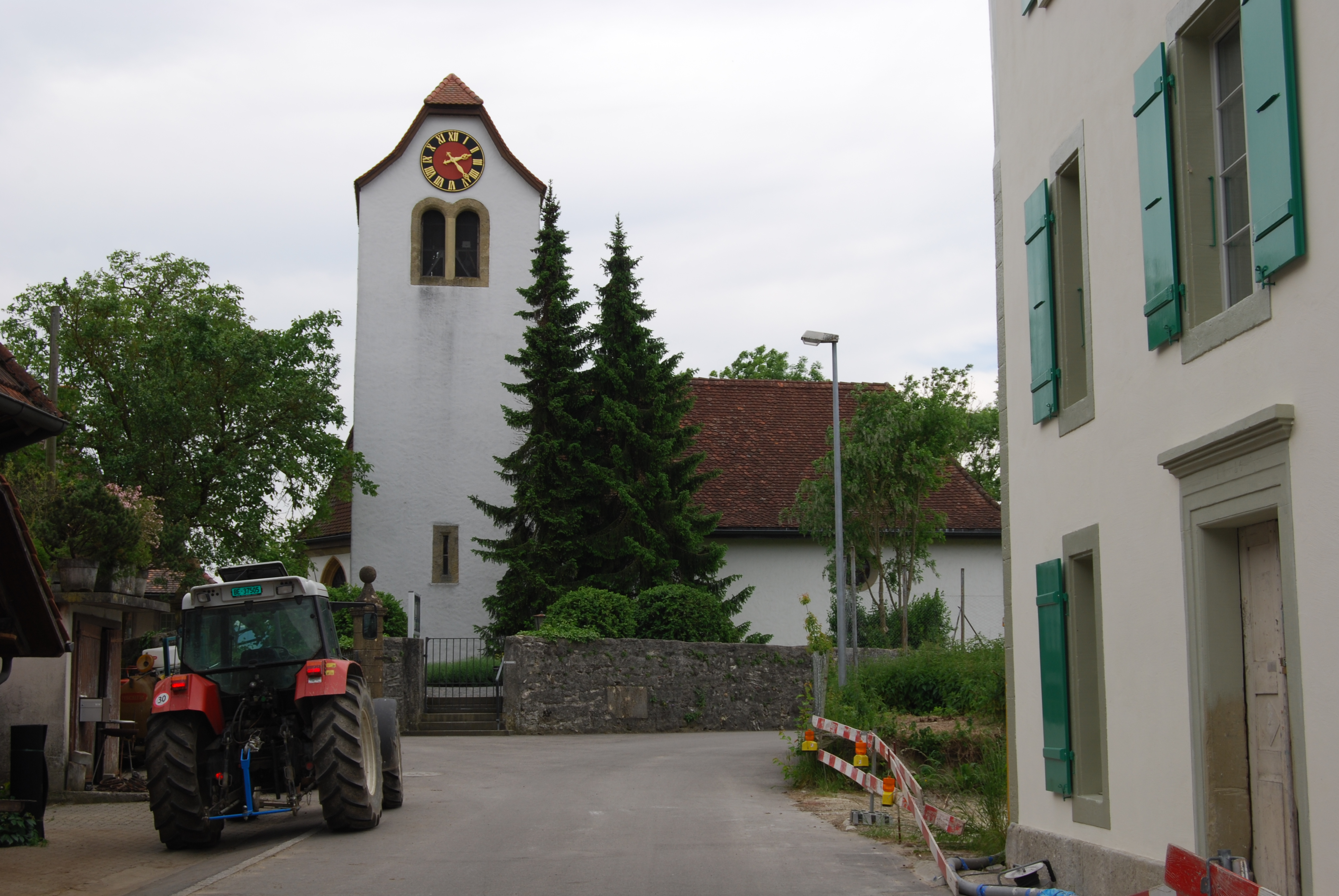
Swiss Reformed church in Walperswil

From the 2000 census, 661 or 83.9% belonged to the Swiss Reformed Church, while 55 or 7.0% were Roman Catholic. Of the rest of the population, there were 2 members of an Orthodox church (or about 0.25% of the population), and there were 13 individuals (or about 1.65% of the population) who belonged to another Christian church. There were 9 (or about 1.14% of the population) who were Islamic. There were 2 individuals who belonged to another church. 22 (or about 2.79% of the population) belonged to no church, are agnostic or atheist, and 24 individuals (or about 3.05% of the population) did not answer the question.

== Education ==
In Walperswil, about 59.5% of the population have completed non-mandatory upper secondary education, and 15.4% have completed additional higher education (either university or a Fachhochschule). Of the 73 who had completed some form of tertiary schooling listed in the census, 68.5% were Swiss men, 27.4% were Swiss women.

The Canton of Bern school system provides one year of non-obligatory Kindergarten, followed by six years of Primary school. This is followed by three years of obligatory lower Secondary school where the students are separated according to ability and aptitude. Following the lower Secondary students may attend additional schooling or they may enter an apprenticeship.

During the 2011-12 school year, there were a total of 119 students attending classes in Walperswil. There was one kindergarten class with a total of 14 students in the municipality. The municipality had 4 primary classes and 88 students. Of the primary students, 1.1% have a different mother language than the classroom language. During the same year, there was one lower secondary class with a total of 17 students.

As of 2000, there were a total of 127 students attending any school in the municipality. Of those, 67 both lived and attended school in the municipality, while 60 students came from another municipality. During the same year, 44 residents attended schools outside the municipality.
