= Epsach =

- Municipality
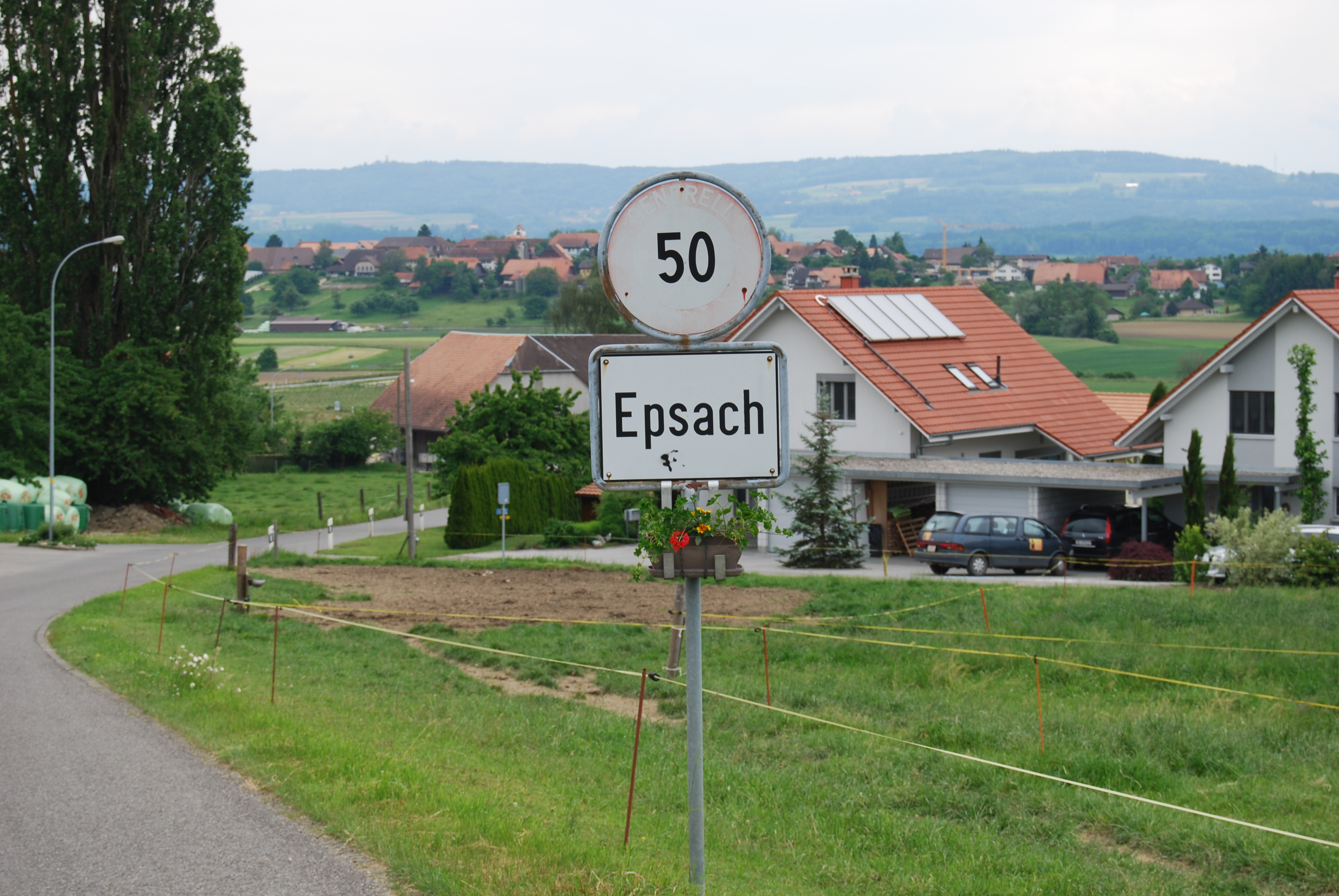

- Flag Coat of arms
- Location of Epsach
- Location within Switzerland Location within Canton of Bern
- Coordinates: 47°4′N 7°13′E
- Country: Switzerland
- Canton: Bern
- District: Seeland

Government
  - Executive: Gemeinderat with 7 members
  - Mayor: Gemeindepräsident

Area
  - Total: 3.4 km^{2} (1.3 sq mi)
- Elevation: 465 m (1,526 ft)

Population (Dec 2011)
  - Total: 336
  - Density: 99/km^{2} (260/sq mi)
- Time zone: UTC+01:00 (CET)
  - Summer (DST): UTC+02:00 (CEST)
- Postal code: 3272
- SFOS number: 735
- ISO 3166 code: CH-BE
- Surrounded by: Bühl, Hermrigen, Mörigen, Täuffelen, Walperswil
- Website: www.epsach.ch

Epsach is a municipality in the Seeland administrative district in the canton of Bern in Switzerland.

== History ==
Epsach is first mentioned in 1244 as Ebza.

The area around Epsach has been inhabited since at least the Bronze Age and the remains of what appears to be a Roman era settlement were discovered between Epsach and Walperswil. During the Late Middle Ages there were several additional settlements within the borders of the modern municipality. The village of Frenschen was mentioned in 1233 but was abandoned in 1377. Less is known about the abandoned settlement of Gummen, but it was probably abandoned during the Middle Ages. Epsach and the surrounding villages were part of the parish of Täuffelen which was part of the Herrschaft of the Counts of Neuchâtel-Nidau. Between 1388 and 1393 the entire Herrschaft was acquired by the city of Bern. Under Bernese rule the Nidau district was divided into four sections, including the Epsach quarter. During the 18th century Epsach was the most populous village in the quarter. Today Epsach is a mostly agricultural village that specializes in producing cherries. However, the number of commuters to jobs in nearby towns has continued to rise.

== Geography ==
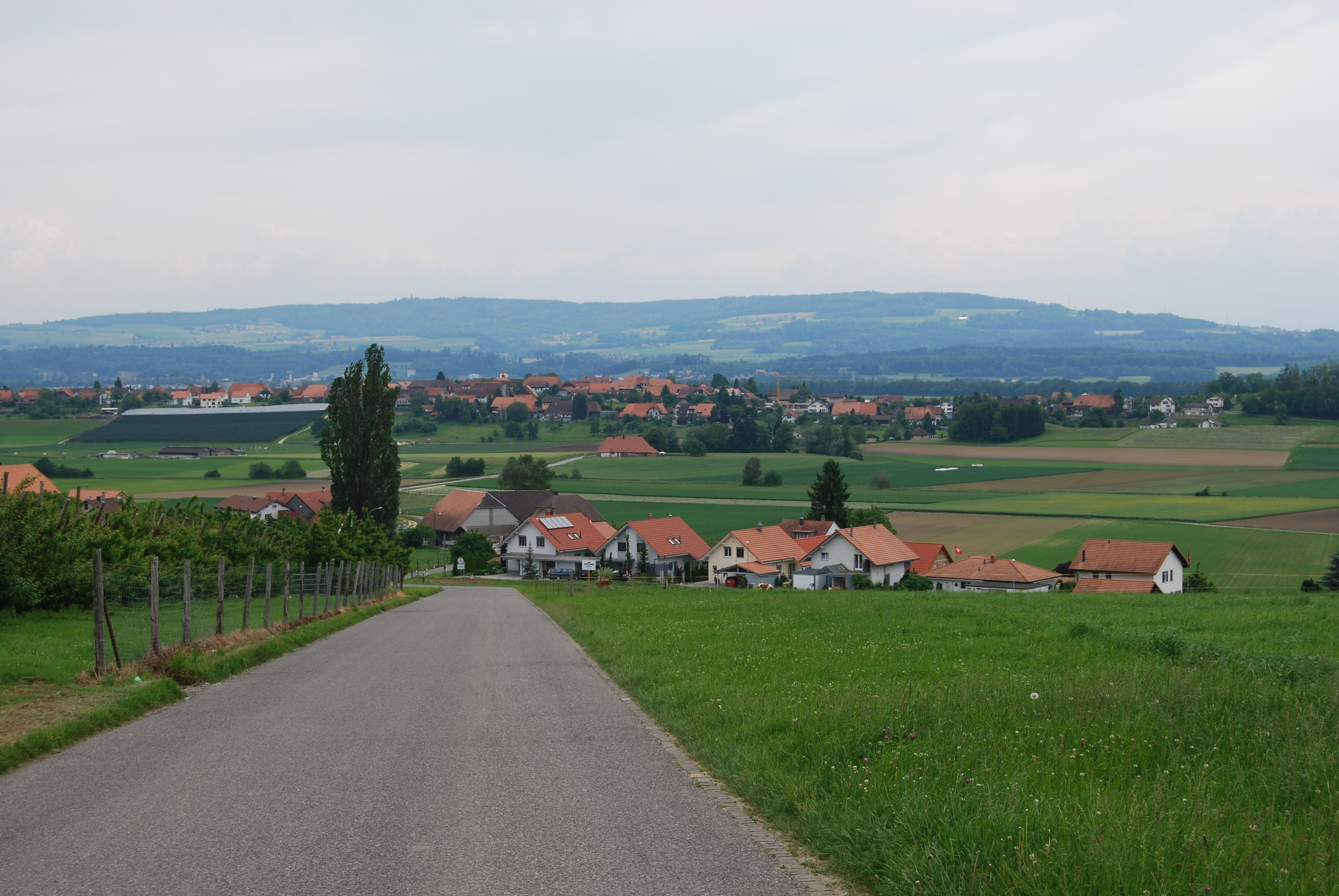
Epsach (foreground) and Walperswil (background) villages

Epsach has an area of 3.41 km^{2} (1.32 sq mi). As of 2012, a total of 2.65 km^{2} (1.02 mi^{2}) or 78.2% is used for agricultural purposes, while 0.48 km^{2} (0.19 mi^{2}) or 14.2% is forested. Of the rest of the land, 0.22 km^{2} (0.085 mi^{2}) or 6.5% is settled (buildings or roads), 0.05 km^{2} (12 acres) or 1.5% is either rivers or lakes and 0.01 km^{2} (2.5 acres) or 0.3% is unproductive land.

During the same year, housing and buildings made up 3.8% and transportation infrastructure made up 2.7%. Out of the forested land, all of the forested land area is covered with heavy forests. Of the agricultural land, 64.3% is used for growing crops and 6.2% is pastures, while 7.7% is used for orchards or vine crops. All the water in the municipality is flowing water.

The municipality is located in the low hills between Lake Biel and the Seeland region. It consists of the villages of Epsach, Klus and Baar.

On 31 December 2009 Amtsbezirk Nidau, the municipality's former district, was dissolved. On the following day, 1 January 2010, it joined the newly created Verwaltungskreis Seeland.

== Coat of arms ==
The blazon of the municipal coat of arms is Per Pale Gules a roman Column Argent and of the last three Annulets in pale of the first.

== Demographics ==
Epsach has a population (as of December 2020) of 326. As of 2010, 2.4% of the population are resident foreign nationals. Over the last 10 years (2001-2011) the population has changed at a rate of 2.4%. Migration accounted for 0.3%, while births and deaths accounted for 0%.

Most of the population (as of 2000) speaks German (311 or 96.6%) as their first language, French is the second most common (7 or 2.2%) and Albanian is the third (2 or 0.6%). There is 1 person who speaks Italian.

As of 2008, the population was 53.0% male and 47.0% female. The population was made up of 168 Swiss men (51.2% of the population) and 6 (1.8%) non-Swiss men. There were 152 Swiss women (46.3%) and 2 (0.6%) non-Swiss women. Of the population in the municipality, 151 or about 46.9% were born in Epsach and lived there in 2000. There were 133 or 41.3% who were born in the same canton, while 22 or 6.8% were born somewhere else in Switzerland, and 10 or 3.1% were born outside of Switzerland.

As of 2011, children and teenagers (0–19 years old) make up 20.2% of the population, while adults (20–64 years old) make up 63.4% and seniors (over 64 years old) make up 16.4%.

As of 2000, there were 127 people who were single and never married in the municipality. There were 171 married individuals, 17 widows or widowers and 7 individuals who are divorced.

As of 2010, there were 29 households that consist of only one person and 8 households with five or more people. In 2000, a total of 110 apartments (94.0% of the total) were permanently occupied, while 4 apartments (3.4%) were seasonally occupied and 3 apartments (2.6%) were empty. As of 2010, the construction rate of new housing units was 3 new units per 1000 residents. In 2011, single family homes made up 53.0% of the total housing in the municipality.

The historical population is given in the following chart:

== Sights ==
The entire village of Epsach is designated as part of the Inventory of Swiss Heritage Sites.

== Politics ==
In the 2011 federal election the most popular party was the Swiss People's Party (SVP) which received 45% of the vote. The next three most popular parties were the Social Democratic Party (SP) (16.1%), the Conservative Democratic Party (BDP) (13.9%) and the Green Party (6.8%). In the federal election, a total of 161 votes were cast, and the voter turnout was 57.3%.

== Economy ==
As of 2011, Epsach had an unemployment rate of 2.39%. As of 2008, there were a total of 106 people employed in the municipality. Of these, there were 74 people employed in the primary economic sector and about 20 businesses involved in this sector. 4 people were employed in the secondary sector and there were 3 businesses in this sector. 28 people were employed in the tertiary sector, with 7 businesses in this sector. There were 155 residents of the municipality who were employed in some capacity, of which females made up 41.3% of the workforce.

In 2008 there were a total of 60 full-time equivalent jobs. The number of jobs in the primary sector was 39, all of which were in agriculture. The number of jobs in the secondary sector was 4 of which 1 was in manufacturing and 3 (75.0%) were in construction. The number of jobs in the tertiary sector was 17. In the tertiary sector; 4 or 23.5% were in wholesale or retail sales or the repair of motor vehicles, 3 or 17.6% were technical professionals or scientists, 3 or 17.6% were in education and 6 or 35.3% were in health care.

In 2000, there were 7 workers who commuted into the municipality and 115 workers who commuted away. The municipality is a net exporter of workers, with about 16.4 workers leaving the municipality for every one entering. A total of 40 workers (85.1% of the 47 total workers in the municipality) both lived and worked in Epsach. Of the working population, 10.3% used public transportation to get to work, and 63.9% used a private car.

In 2011 the average local and cantonal tax rate on a married resident, with two children, of Epsach making 150,000 CHF was 13.2%, while an unmarried resident's rate was 19.4%. For comparison, the rate for the entire canton in the same year, was 14.2% and 22.0%, while the nationwide rate was 12.3% and 21.1% respectively. In 2009 there were a total of 145 tax payers in the municipality. Of that total, 50 made over 75,000 CHF per year. There was one person who made between 15,000 and 20,000 per year. The average income of the over 75,000 CHF group in Epsach was 98,804 CHF, while the average across all of Switzerland was 130,478 CHF.

In 2011 a total of 1.2% of the population received direct financial assistance from the government.

== Religion ==
From the 2000 census, 283 or 87.9% belonged to the Swiss Reformed Church, while 7 or 2.2% were Roman Catholic. Of the rest of the population, there was 1 individual who belongs to the Christian Catholic Church, and there were 4 individuals (or about 1.24% of the population) who belonged to another Christian church. There were 3 (or about 0.93% of the population) who were Islamic. There was 1 person who was Buddhist. 13 (or about 4.04% of the population) belonged to no church, are agnostic or atheist, and 10 individuals (or about 3.11% of the population) did not answer the question.

== Education ==
In Epsach about 55% of the population have completed non-mandatory upper secondary education, and 18.7% have completed additional higher education (either university or a Fachhochschule). Of the 32 who had completed some form of tertiary schooling listed in the census, 78.1% were Swiss men, 18.8% were Swiss women.

The Canton of Bern school system provides one year of non-obligatory Kindergarten, followed by six years of Primary school. This is followed by three years of obligatory lower Secondary school where the students are separated according to ability and aptitude. Following the lower Secondary students may attend additional schooling or they may enter an apprenticeship.

During the 2011-12 school year, there were a total of 22 students attending classes in Epsach. There were no kindergarten classes in the municipality. The municipality had 2 primary classes and 22 students. Of the primary students, 9.1% have a different mother language than the classroom language.

As of 2000, there were a total of 27 students attending any school in the municipality. Of those, 27 both lived and attended school in the municipality, while 28 students from Epsach attended schools outside the municipality. During the same year, 28 residents attended schools outside the municipality.
