= Lene Buhl-Mortensen =

Dano-Norwegian marine biologist

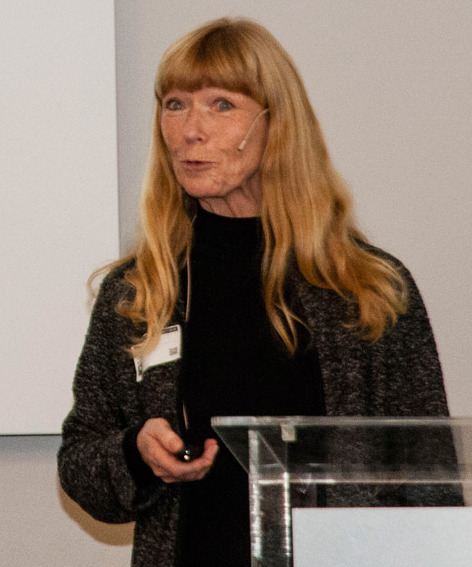
Lene Buhl-Mortensen in 2017

Lene Buhl-Mortensen (born 20 June 1956 in Esbjerg) is a Dano-Norwegian marine biologist. She is a Research Professor at the Norwegian Institute of Marine Research. She is an expert on the biogeography of the amphipod fauna in Norwegian waters, on the taxonomy of amphipods, barnacles and copepods, and on mapping of biodiversity in the Barents Sea.

She holds a fil.kand. degree in biology from the University of Gothenburg (1980) and a dr.scient. (PhD) from the University of Bergen (1994). She has been head of MAREANO, a national mapping program to document the topography, environment and seabed fauna outside Norway funded directly over the state budget of Norway. She has also discovered several new species in this area.
