= Christine Buhl Andersen =

Danish art historian and museum director

Christine Buhl Andersen (born 1967) is a Danish art historian and museum director. After holding a number of high-ranking positions in Danish museums and museum associations, in March 2017 she was appointed director of the New Carlsberg Glyptotek, a museum which builds on the collection of the successful brewer and classical art enthusiast Carl Jacobsen (1842–1914). In August 2019, the New Carlsberg Foundation announced that she was to be appointed its new chair.

In Denmark, she is well known as a frequent competitor on the DR TV programme "Kulturquiz" (Culture Quiz).

== Biography ==
Born on 27 April 1967 in Copenhagen, Christine Buhl Andersen is the daughter of the architect Charlotte Buhl and the civil engineer S. Palle Andersen. Raised initially in central Copenhagen, when she was seven she moved with her family to Hellerup. At high school, she focused on music and mathematics. After an extensive trip to India, Nepal and Australia, she studied Danish at the University of Roskilde and history of art at the University of Copenhagen, graduating in 1995. She later earned a master's degree in museology in 2007 at Aarhus University, specializing in museum leadership and contemporary art. More recently, she completed a course in museum management at the Getty Leadership Institute in California.

In 1991, Buhl Andersen began contributing articles on culture and literature to Danish newspapers on a freelance basis. From 1995, she helped arrange exhibitions at the Louisiana Museum and Gammel Strand, before becoming curator at Sorø Art Museum in 1999. From 2007, she was chair of the international art committee at the Danish Arts Council until she chaired the board of the Association of Danish Museums in 2011. In parallel, she was director of the Museum of Art in Public Spaces in Køge until she was appointed director of the New Carlsberg Glyptotek in March 2017. In August 2019, Buhl Andersen was appointed chair of the New Carlsberg Foundation. She took up the appointment on 1 March 2020.
