= Bühl bei Aarberg =

- Municipality
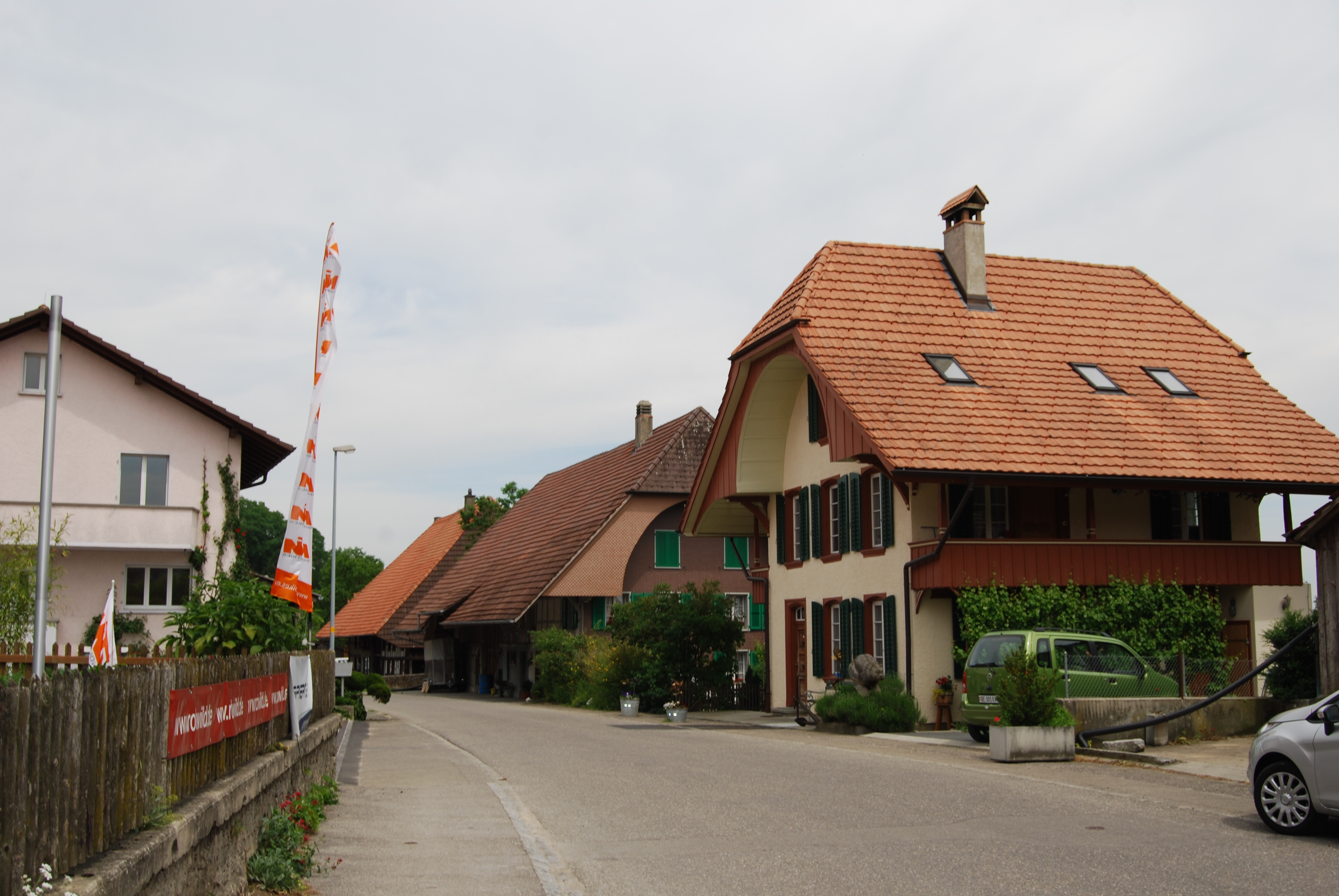

- Flag Coat of arms
- Location of Bühl bei Aarberg
- Location within Switzerland Location within Canton of Bern
- Coordinates: 47°4′N 7°15′E
- Country: Switzerland
- Canton: Bern
- District: Seeland

Area
  - Total: 3.0 km^{2} (1.2 sq mi)
- Elevation: 514 m (1,686 ft)

Population (Dec 2011)
  - Total: 416
  - Density: 140/km^{2} (360/sq mi)
- Time zone: UTC+01:00 (CET)
  - Summer (DST): UTC+02:00 (CEST)
- Postal code: 3274
- SFOS number: 734
- ISO 3166 code: CH-BE
- Surrounded by: Hermrigen, Kappelen, Walperswil, Epsach
- Website: https://www.buehl.ch SFSO statistics

Bühl bei Aarberg (or simply Bühl) is a municipality in the Seeland administrative district in the canton of Bern in Switzerland.

== History ==
Bühl is first mentioned in 1261 as Bule.

During the 13th century the land and rights over the village were owned by the Counts of Kyburg and the Kyburg Ministerialis (unfree knights in the service of a feudal overlord) families of Schüpfen, Mattstetten and Mörigen. It was part of the Herrschaft of Nidau, which was partly acquired by Bern in 1388 and fully acquired in 1393. Under Bernese control Bühl was combined with Walperswil to form a community that was known as the Upper County. Bühl was also part of the parish of Walperswil. It remained a small farming community for most of its history. While agriculture is still important in Bühl, over half of the residents commute to jobs in neighboring cities and towns. Additionally, even though it is an independent municipality, it shares much of the civic infrastructure with neighboring municipalities, such as the Zivilstandsamt (Vital records office), school and medical care.

== Geography ==
Bühl has an area of 2.97 km^{2} (1.15 sq mi). As of 2012, a total of 2.65 km^{2} (1.02 mi^{2}) or 88.9% is used for agricultural purposes, while 0.1 km^{2} (0.039 mi^{2}) or 3.4% is forested. Of the rest of the land, 0.21 km^{2} (0.081 mi^{2}) or 7.0% is settled (buildings or roads) and 0.02 km^{2} (4.9 acres) or 0.7% is unproductive land.

During the same year, housing and buildings made up 4.7% and transportation infrastructure made up 2.3%. Out of the forested land, 1.3% of the total land area is heavily forested and 2.0% is covered with orchards or small clusters of trees. Of the agricultural land, 76.2% is used for growing crops and 11.1% is pastures, while 1.7% is used for orchards or vine crops.

It is located on a hill on the edge of the Berner Seeland. Its neighboring municipalities in a clockwise direction from the north are Hermrigen, Kappelen, Walperswil and Epsach.

On 31 December 2009 Amtsbezirk Nidau, the municipality's former district, was dissolved. On the following day, 1 January 2010, it joined the newly created Verwaltungskreis Seeland.

== Coat of arms ==
The blazon of the municipal coat of arms is Gules a Vine Tree Or issuant from a Mount Vert.

== Demographics ==
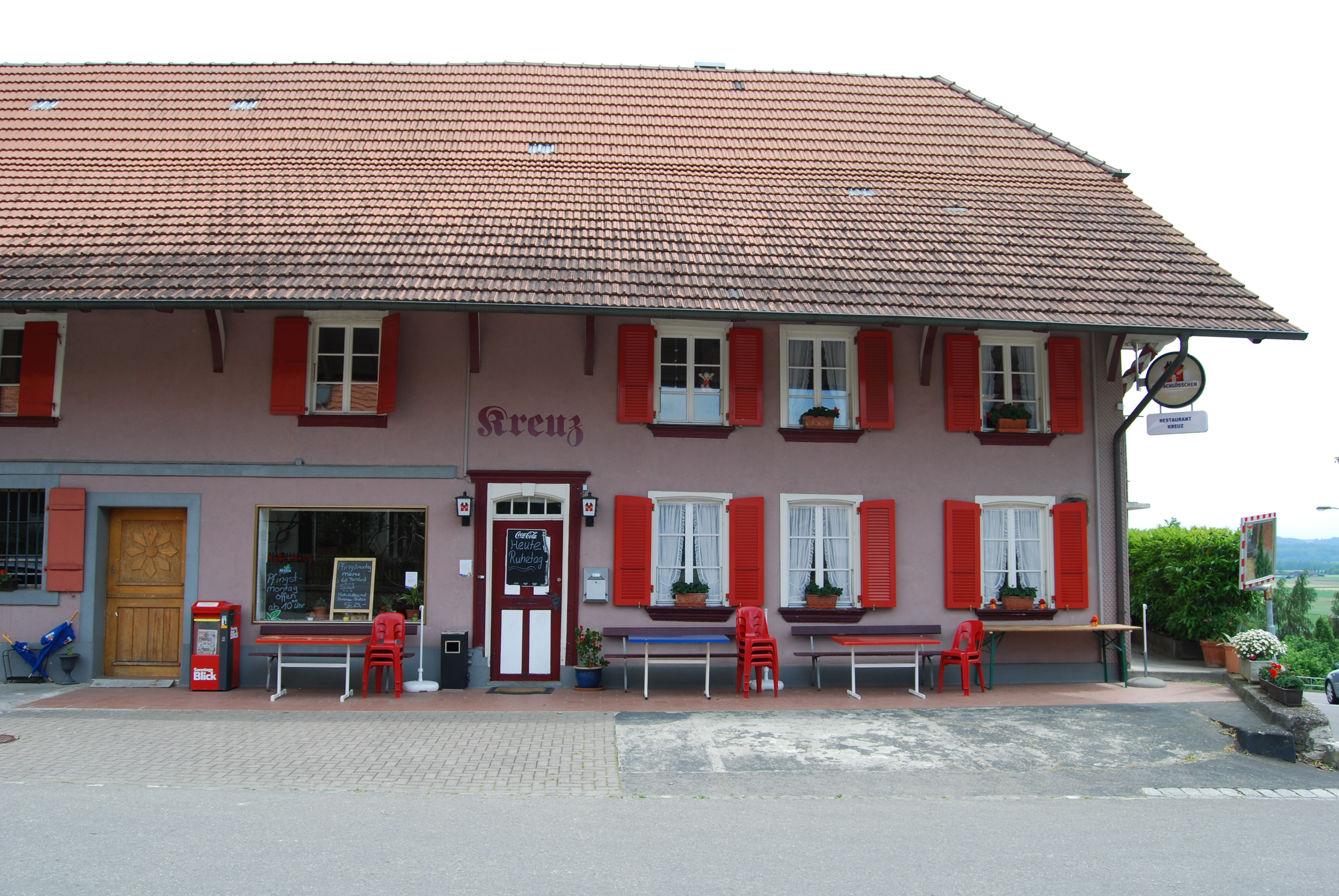
Kreuz Restaurant in the village

Bühl has a population (as of December 2020) of 482. As of 2010, 2.6% of the population are resident foreign nationals. Over the last 10 years (2001-2011) the population has changed at a rate of -0.7%. Migration accounted for -2.1%, while births and deaths accounted for 0%.

Most of the population (as of 2000) speaks German (370 or 95.1%) as their first language, French is the second most common (10 or 2.6%) and Portuguese is the third (2 or 0.5%). There is 1 person who speaks Italian.

As of 2008, the population was 49.6% male and 50.4% female. The population was made up of 198 Swiss men (47.3% of the population) and 10 (2.4%) non-Swiss men. There were 210 Swiss women (50.1%) and 1 (0.2%) non-Swiss women. Of the population in the municipality, 136 or about 35.0% were born in Bühl and lived there in 2000. There were 162 or 41.6% who were born in the same canton, while 61 or 15.7% were born somewhere else in Switzerland, and 21 or 5.4% were born outside of Switzerland.

As of 2011, children and teenagers (0–19 years old) make up 18.5% of the population, while adults (20–64 years old) make up 62.5% and seniors (over 64 years old) make up 19%.

As of 2000, there were 156 people who were single and never married in the municipality. There were 194 married individuals, 21 widows or widowers and 18 individuals who are divorced.

As of 2010, there were 43 households that consist of only one person and 7 households with five or more people. In 2000, a total of 153 apartments (96.2% of the total) were permanently occupied, while 3 apartments (1.9%) were seasonally occupied and 3 apartments (1.9%) were empty. The vacancy rate for the municipality, in 2012, was 1.04%. In 2011, single family homes made up 64.5% of the total housing in the municipality.

The historical population is given in the following chart:

== Politics ==
In the 2011 federal election the most popular party was the Swiss People's Party (SVP) which received 37.5% of the vote. The next three most popular parties were the Conservative Democratic Party (BDP) (25.7%), the Social Democratic Party (SP) (10.4%) and the FDP.The Liberals (6.6%). In the federal election, a total of 179 votes were cast, and the voter turnout was 53.3%.

== Economy ==
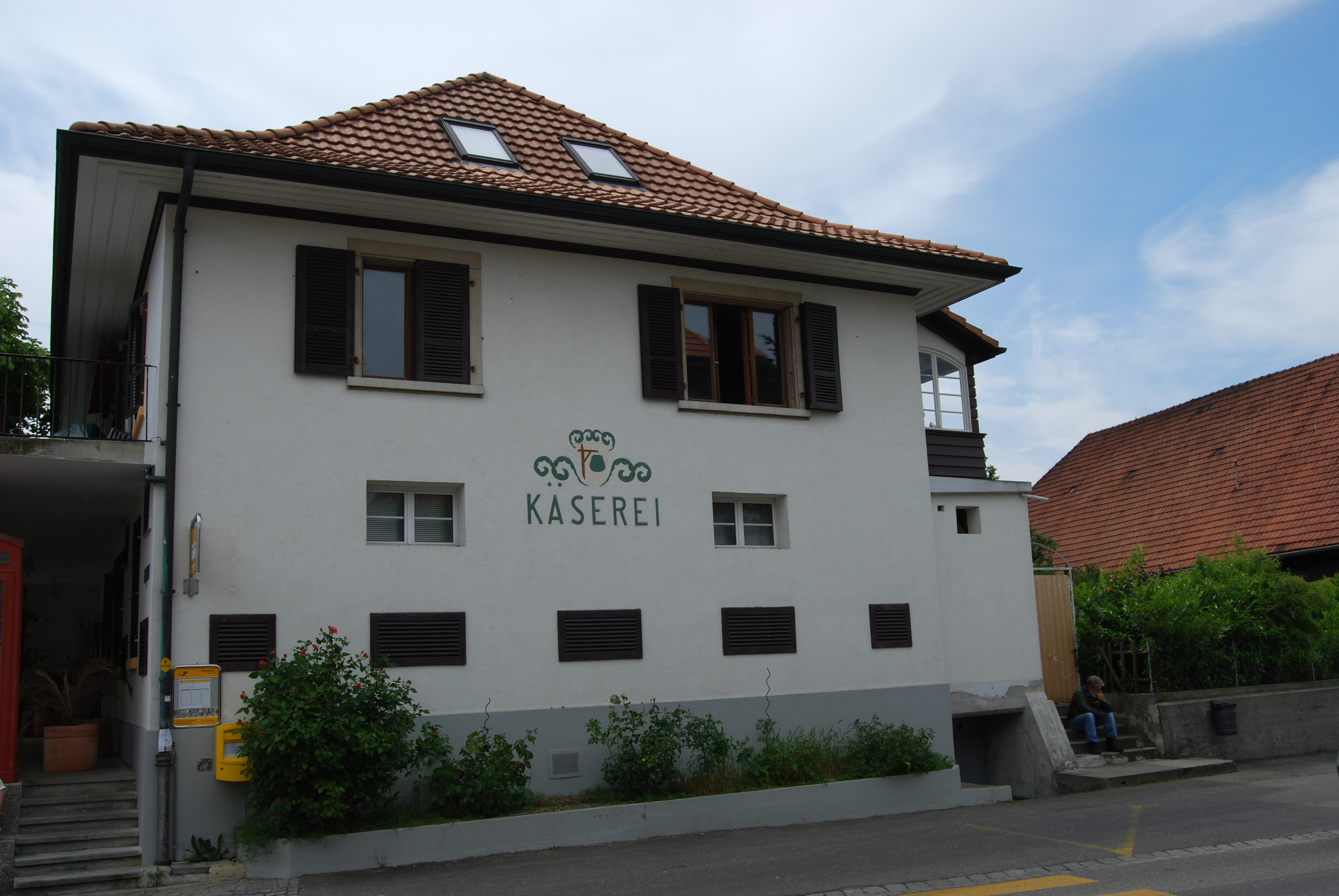
A dairy and cheese maker in Bühl

As of 2011, Bühl had an unemployment rate of 0.39%. As of 2008, there were a total of 73 people employed in the municipality. Of these, there were 36 people employed in the primary economic sector and about 10 businesses involved in this sector. 8 people were employed in the secondary sector and there were 4 businesses in this sector. 29 people were employed in the tertiary sector, with 7 businesses in this sector. There were 231 residents of the municipality who were employed in some capacity, of which females made up 40.7% of the workforce.

In 2008 there were a total of 49 full-time equivalent jobs. The number of jobs in the primary sector was 24, all of which were in agriculture. The number of jobs in the secondary sector was 7 of which 1 was in manufacturing and 6 (85.7%) were in construction. The number of jobs in the tertiary sector was 18. In the tertiary sector; 8 or 44.4% were in wholesale or retail sales or the repair of motor vehicles, 4 or 22.2% were in a hotel or restaurant, 1 was the insurance or financial industry, and .

In 2000, there were 10 workers who commuted into the municipality and 173 workers who commuted away. The municipality is a net exporter of workers, with about 17.3 workers leaving the municipality for every one entering. A total of 58 workers (85.3% of the 68 total workers in the municipality) both lived and worked in Bühl. Of the working population, 7.8% used public transportation to get to work, and 65.8% used a private car.

In 2011 the average local and cantonal tax rate on a married resident, with two children, of Bühl making 150,000 CHF was 12.9%, while an unmarried resident's rate was 19%. For comparison, the rate for the entire canton in the same year, was 14.2% and 22.0%, while the nationwide rate was 12.3% and 21.1% respectively. In 2009 there were a total of 218 tax payers in the municipality. Of that total, 69 made over 75,000 CHF per year. There were 4 people who made between 15,000 and 20,000 per year. The average income of the over 75,000 CHF group in Bühl was 113,661 CHF, while the average across all of Switzerland was 130,478 CHF.

In 2011 a total of 0.7% of the population received direct financial assistance from the government.

== Religion ==
From the 2000 census, 312 or 80.2% belonged to the Swiss Reformed Church, while 35 or 9.0% were Roman Catholic. There was 1 individual who was Islamic. There were 2 individuals who were Buddhist. 31 (or about 7.97% of the population) belonged to no church, are agnostic or atheist, and 8 individuals (or about 2.06% of the population) did not answer the question.

== Education ==
In Bühl about 56.6% of the population have completed non-mandatory upper secondary education, and 20.6% have completed additional higher education (either university or a Fachhochschule). Of the 51 who had completed some form of tertiary schooling listed in the census, 76.5% were Swiss men, 19.6% were Swiss women.

As of 2000, there were a total of 21 students attending any school in the municipality. Of those, 7 both lived and attended school in the municipality, while 14 students came from another municipality. During the same year, 37 residents attended schools outside the municipality.
