= Coucy =

Coucy is the name or part of the name of several communes in France:

- Coucy-la-Ville, in the Aisne département, very close to
- Coucy-le-Château-Auffrique, in the Aisne département, location of:
  - Château de Coucy
  - Lord of Coucy, a medieval lordship linked to the Château (see below)
- Coucy, Ardennes, in the Ardennes département
- Coucy-lès-Eppes in the Aisne département

== People ==
- Marie de Coucy (c.1218–1285), Queen-consort of Scotland, wife to Alexander II of Scotland, daughter to Enguerrand III below.
- Robert De Coucy or Courcy, architect of Reims Cathedral, and his father of the same name.

Lords of Coucy:

- Enguerrand I, Lord of Coucy (1080–1116)
- Thomas, Lord of Coucy (1116–1130) and Count of Amiens.
- Enguerrand II, Lord of Coucy (1130–1149)
- Ralph I, Lord of Coucy (1149–1191)
- Enguerrand III, Lord of Coucy (1191–1246)
- Raoul II, Lord of Coucy (1246–1250)
- Enguerrand IV, Lord of Coucy (1250–1311) brother of Raoul II
- Enguerrand V, Lord of Coucy (1311–1321), son of Arnold III of Guînes and Alix Coucy. Grandson of Enguerrand III, Lord of Coucy
- William, Lord of Coucy (1321–1335)
- Enguerrand VI, Lord of Coucy (1335–1346)
- Enguerrand VII, Lord of Coucy (1346–1397)
