= Vair =

Varied tincture or fur in heraldry

Vair plain

Vair is a fur tincture in heraldry, describing a two-color pattern covering the field or a division of the field in a manner considered similar to red squirrel furs, formerly much used in noble and royal mantles. The original form (now distinguished as vair ancien) consisted of rows of wavy U shapes similar the squirrels' white underbellies on such mantles. The modern form is more abstract, formed of rows of tiled irregular heptagons known as "panes" or "bells". The default modern pattern is the metal argent (white or silver) over the colour azure (blue), although other orders and hues can be specified in a blazon using the field description vairy.

== Origins ==
The word vair, with its variant forms veir and vairé ("vaired"), was brought into Middle English from Old French, from Latin varius ("varied, variegated"), and has been alternatively termed variorum opus ("variegated work").

The squirrel in question is a variety of the Eurasian red squirrel, Sciurus vulgaris. In the coldest parts of Northern and Central Europe, especially the Baltic region, the winter coat of this squirrel is blue-grey on the back and white on the belly and was much used for the lining of noble and royal mantles. It was sewn together in alternating cup-shaped pieces of back and belly fur, resulting in a pattern of grey-blue and grey-white which, when simplified in heraldic drawing and painting, became blue and white in alternating pieces.

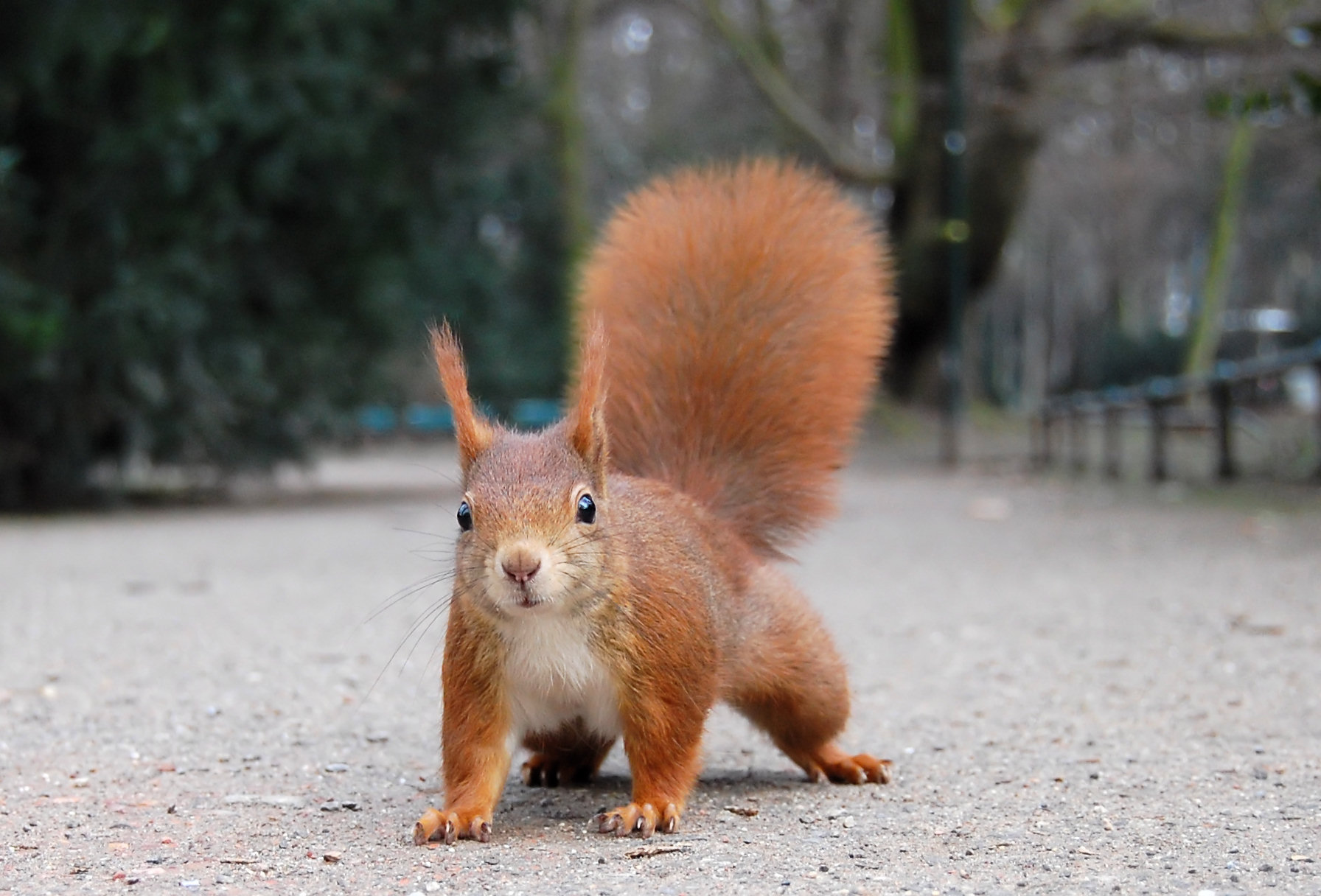
Eurasian red squirrel
(S. vulgaris)

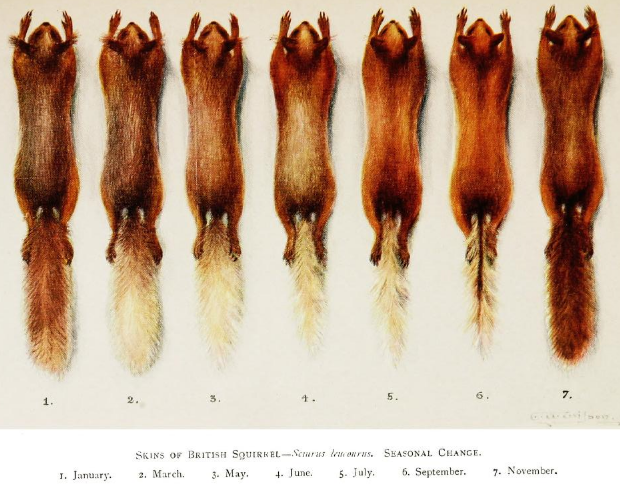
Red squirrel fur at different seasons

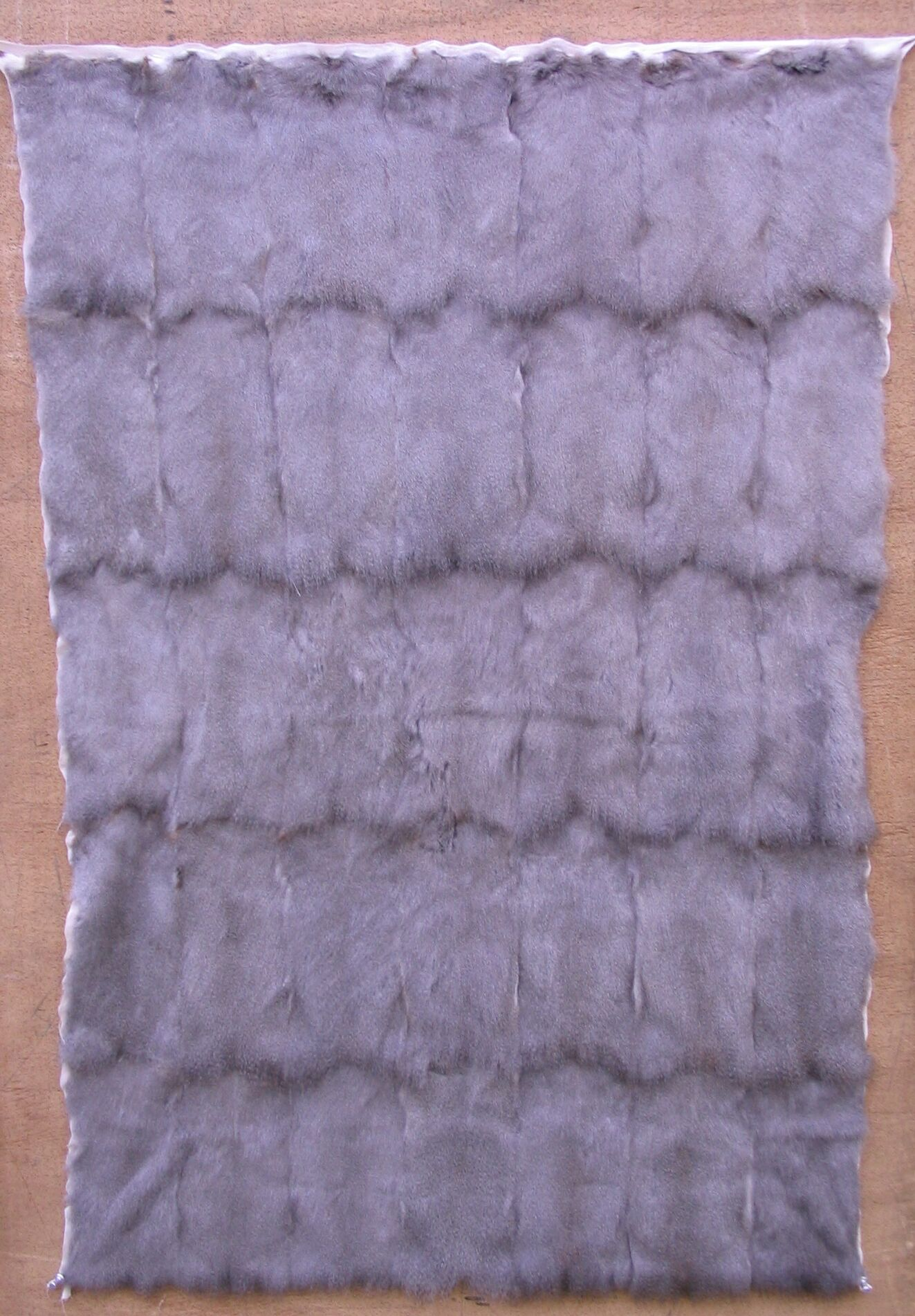
Squirrel backs on a rack

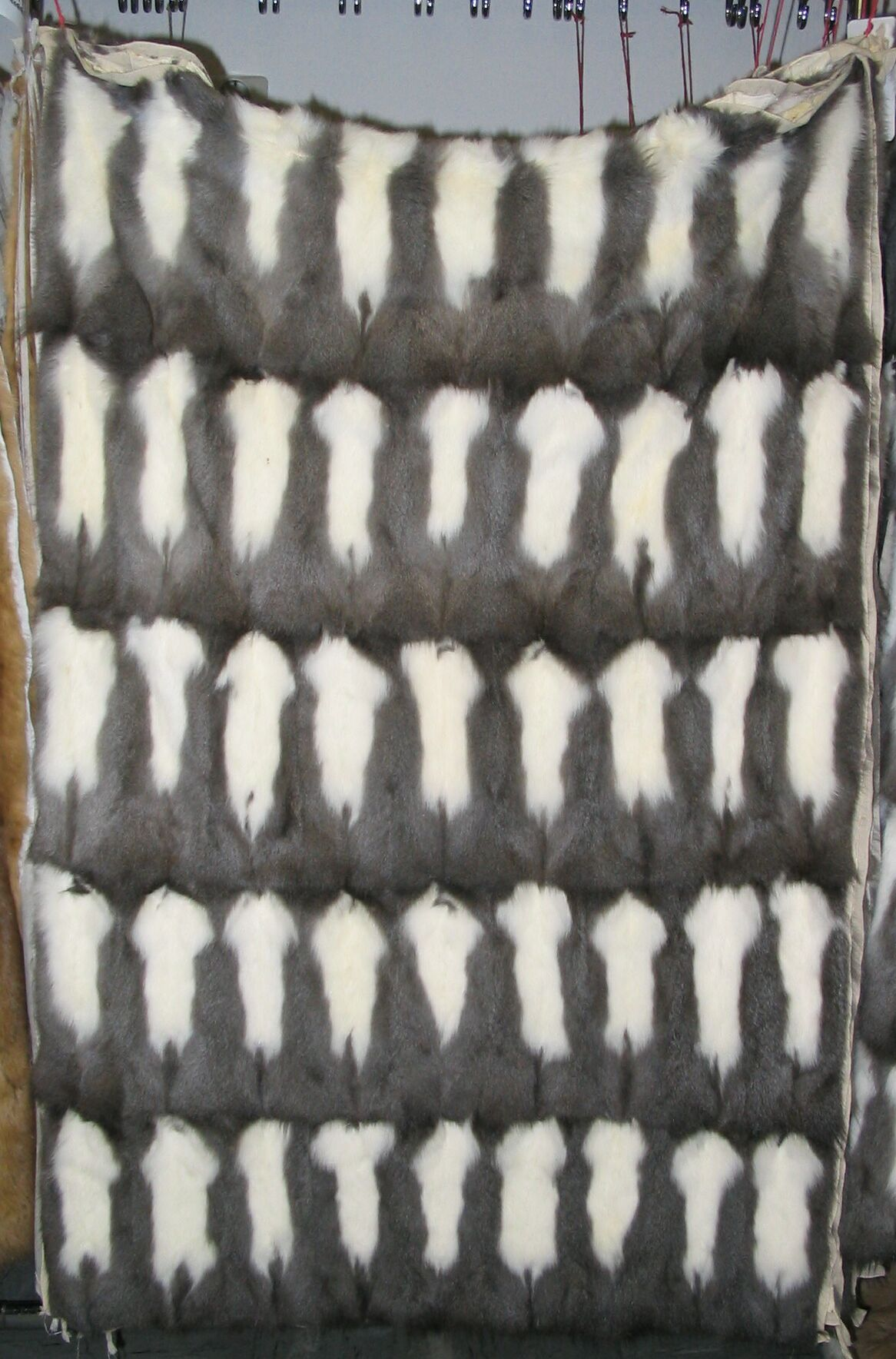
Squirrel bellies on a rack

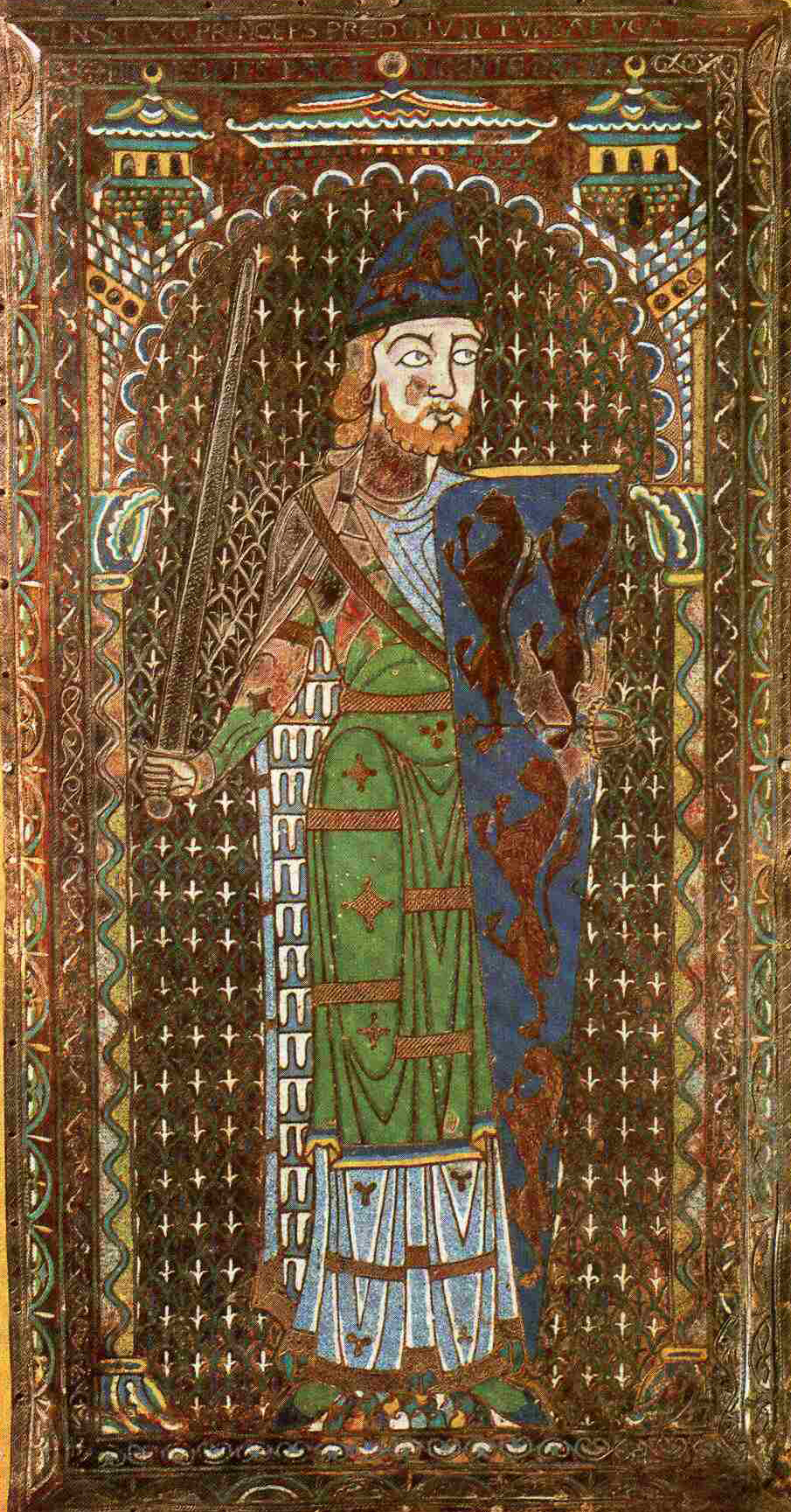
12th-century image of Geoffrey V of Anjou in a vair-lined mantle

== Plain form ==
In modern heraldry, vair is usually presented as rows of alternating irregular heptagonal shapes conventionally known as panes or "vair bells". The panes of one tincture form the upper part of the row, pointing downward from wide tops, while those of the opposite tincture are on the bottom, pointing upward from wide bases. Unless otherwise specified, the tinctures are argent (white or silver) and azure (blue), although others can be specified in a blazon. Following the reasoning that metals are "more honourable" than colour, the argent panes are now typically placed in the upper part of each row and the azure panes below.

Modern vair plain
in six rows

== Variations ==
In earlier heraldry, vair was represented by means of straight horizontal lines alternating with wavy lines. This is still sometimes found, specified by the names vair ondé ("wavy vair") or vair ancien ("ancient vair"). (Note: As with many heraldic terms, the Norman French spelling is commonly used, even in English heraldry; but the Anglicized form, vair ancient, is also found.) In German, it is known as Wolkenfeh, "cloud vair". Continental forms frequently use an extremely globular form for the panes.

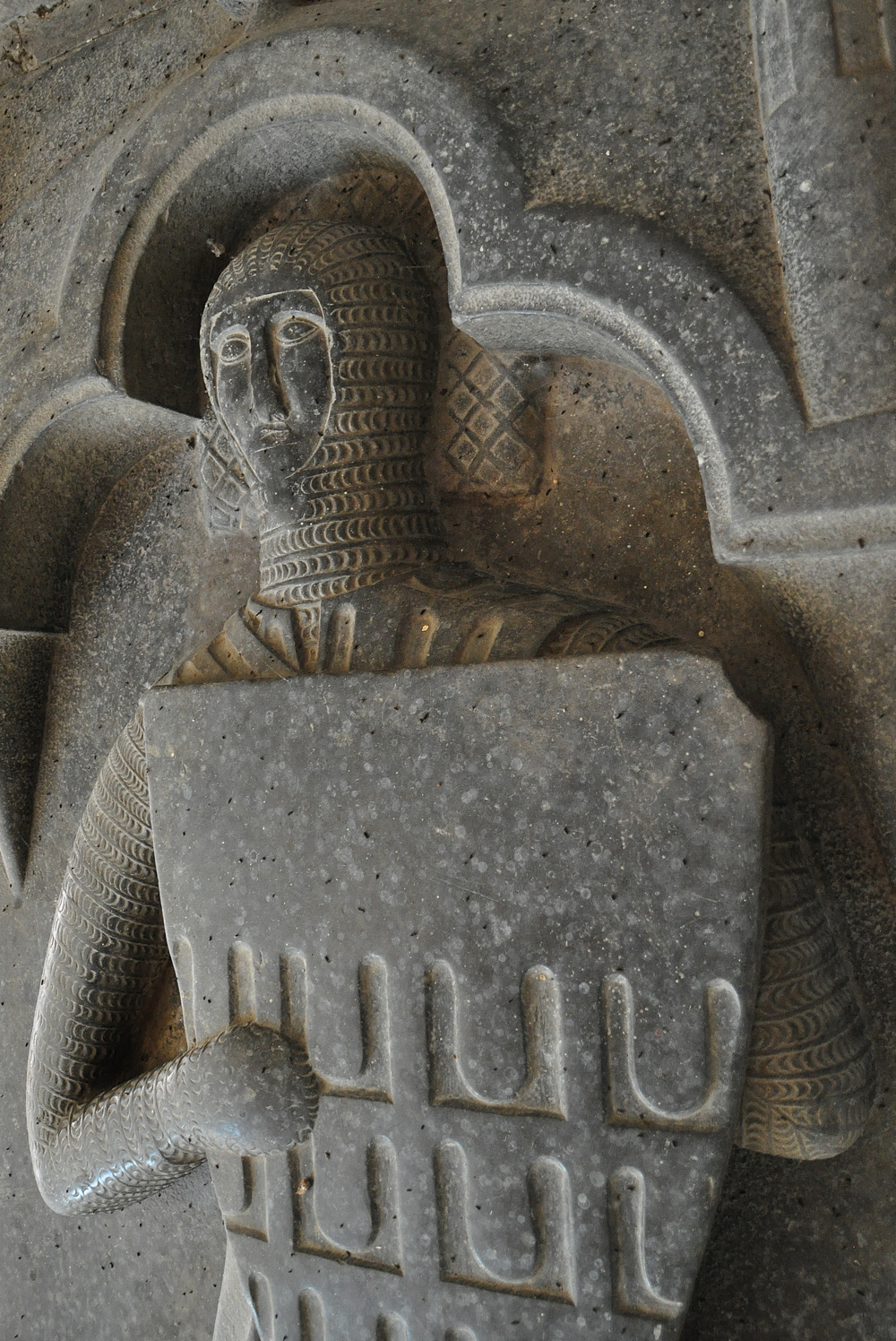
13th-century effigy of Raoul II, lord of Coucy

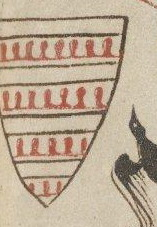
13th-century manuscript image of the same coat of arms

Vair ancien

Vair ancien
(Continental)

Regarding other hues, usage is varied, with some authorities considering furs to be natural patterns outside the Rule of Tincture and others asserting that they must observe it, employing one metal and one colour. When other colours are used, the field is termed vairé ("vaired") or vairy (Note: Sometimes, in older authorities, varry or verry.) of the tinctures used. A vair shield with the order of the white and blue panes reversed may be described as vair inverted, vair renversé, or as vairy argent and azure. (This was formerly the usual style of vair in Tudor England.) Ermine or one of its variants is sometimes used, with an ermine spot appearing in each pane of that tincture. Fields vairé of four colours are also known, usually consisting of two metals and two colours. This is known in German as Buntfeh ("checked vair").

Vair ancien inverted

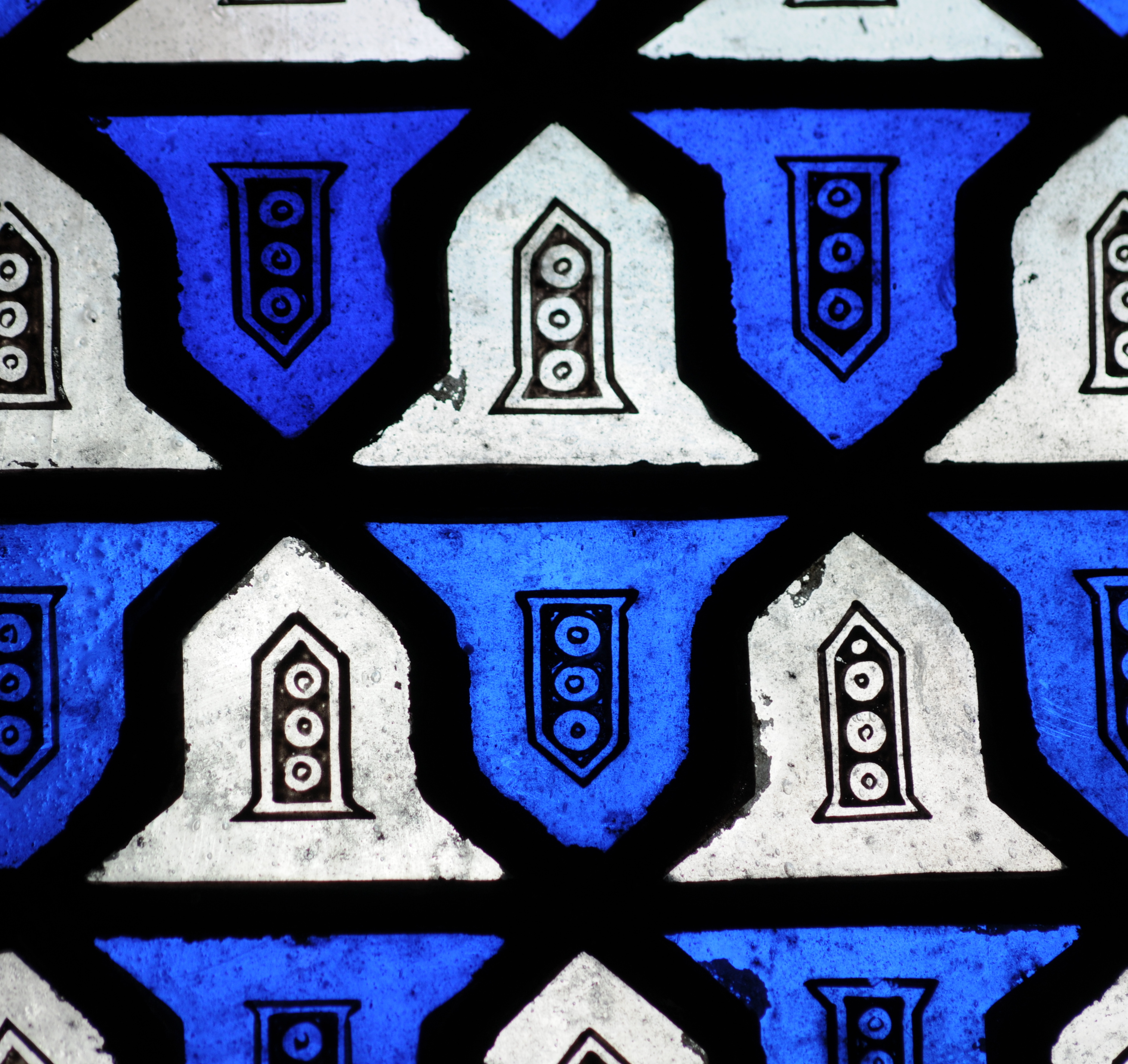
Vair inverted from the Tichborne arms in Winchester Castle

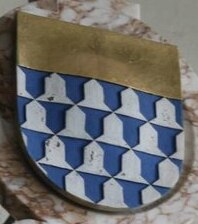
The same arms at St Andrew's, Tichborne

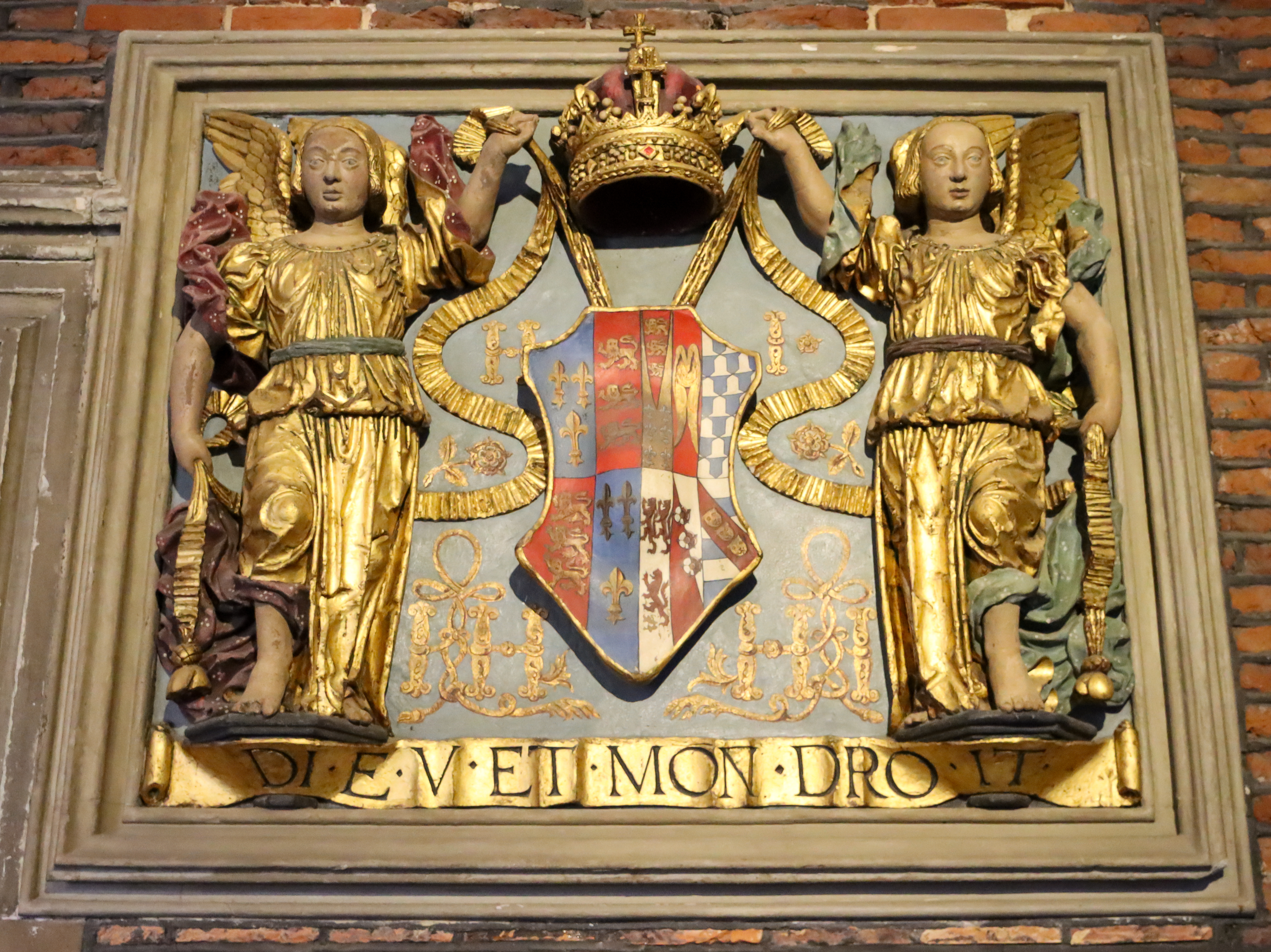
Coat of arms of Jane Seymour at Hampton Court Palace

Vairy or and azure

Vairy ermine and gules

Checked vairy

Traditionally vair was produced in three sizes, and each size came to be depicted in armory. A field consisting of only three rows, representing the largest size, was termed gros vair or beffroi (from the same root as the English word belfry); vair of four rows was simply vair, while if there were six rows, representing the smallest size, it was menu-vair (whence the English word miniver). This distinction is not generally observed in English heraldry and is not strictly observed in Continental heraldry, although in French heraldry it is customary to specify the number of rows if there are more than four.

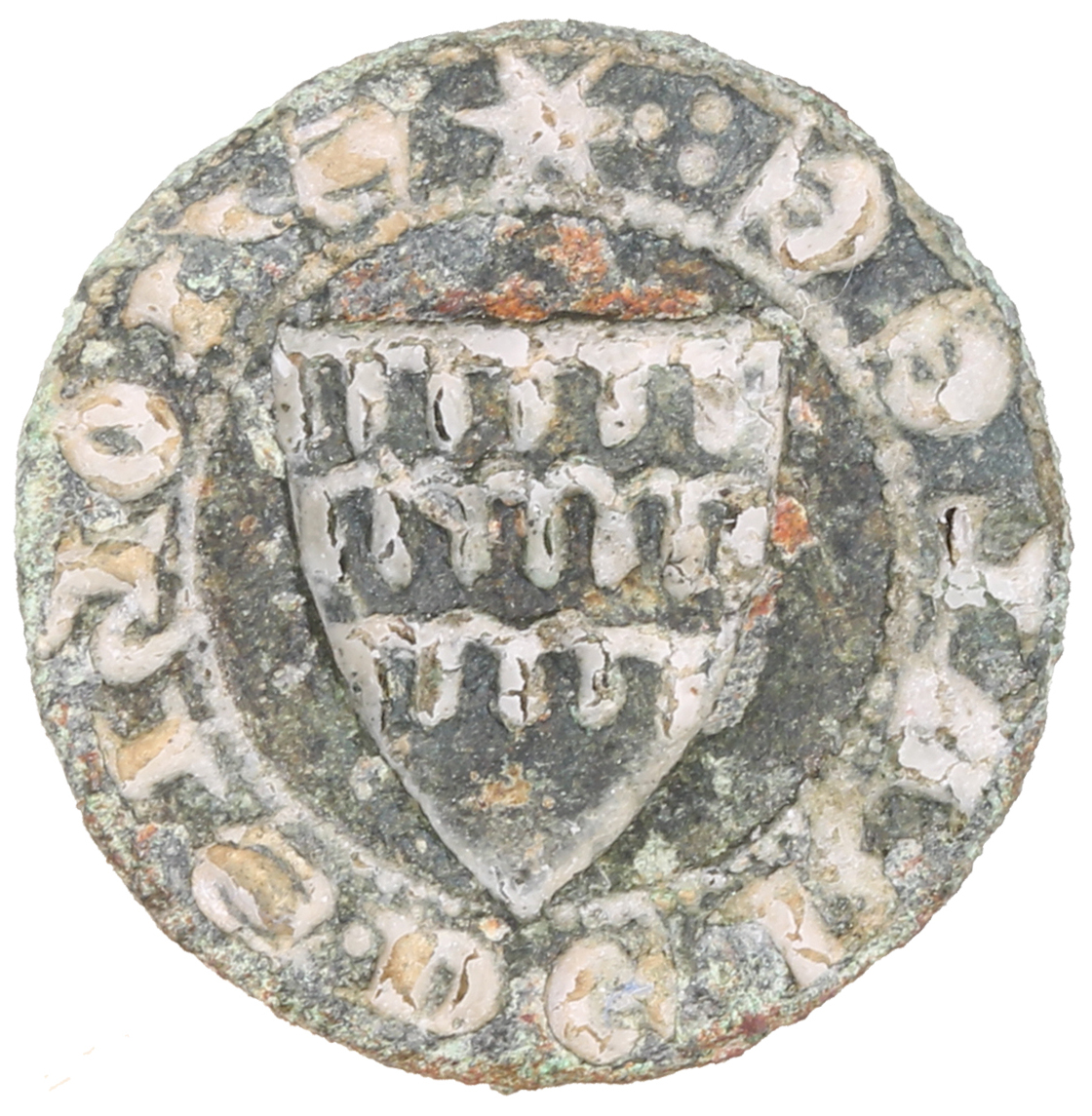
Seal with gros vair coat of arms

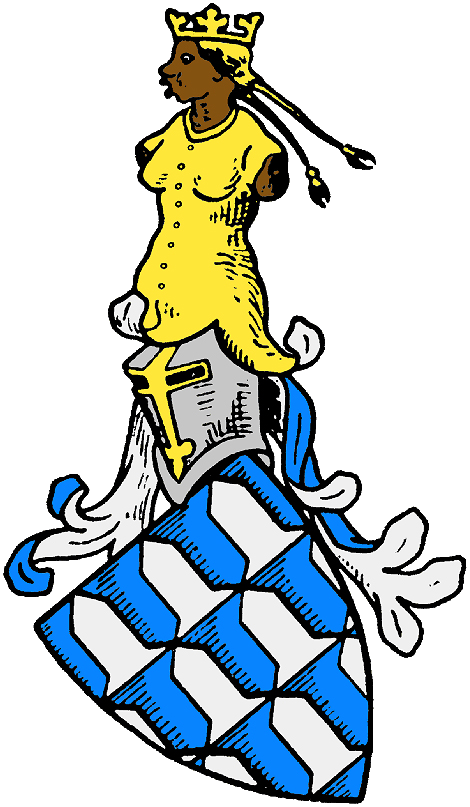
Pappenheim coat of arms, gros vair inverted

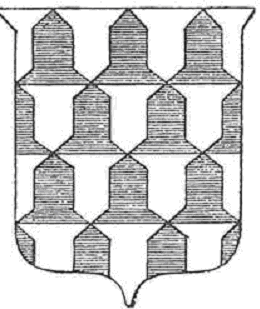
Vair plain in 4 rows

Menu-vair (6 rows)

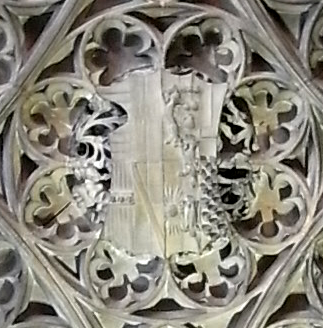
Vault of Poyntz Chapel in St Mark's, Bristol, with vair in 11 rows

There are also forms of vair in which the arrangement of the rows is changed. The most familiar is counter-vair (Fr. contre vair), in which succeeding rows are reversed instead of staggered, so that the bases of the panes of each tincture are opposite those of the same tincture in adjoining rows. Less common is vair in pale (Fr. vair en pal or vair appointé, Ger. Pfahlfeh), in which the panes of each tincture are arranged in vertical columns. Vair in bend (Fr. vair en bande) and vair in bend sinister (Fr. vair en barre), in which the panes are arranged in diagonal rows, is found in continental heraldry. Vair in point (Fr. vair en pointe, Ger. Wogenfeh, "wave vair") is formed by reversing alternate rows, as in counter-vair, and then displacing them by half the width of a pane, forming an undulating pattern across adjoining rows. German heraldry also uses a form called alternate vair (Wechselfeh), in which each pane is divided in half along a vertical line, one side being argent and the other azure. Any of these may be combined with size or color variations, though the variants which changed several aspects are correspondingly rarer.

Counter-vair

Vair in pale

Vairy in bend
or and azure

Vair in pointe

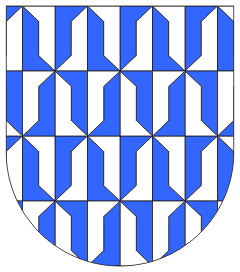
Alternate vair

== Potent and other shapes ==
Potent (Note: Occasionally, varry cuppy.) (Ger. Sturzkrückenfeh, "upside-down crutch vair") is a similar pattern consisting of T-shapes. In this form, the familiar "vair bell" is replaced by a T-shaped figure, known as a "potent" due to its resemblance to a crutch. The pattern used with tinctures other than argent and azure is termed potenté or potenty of those colours. The appearance of this shape is thought by some authorities to have originated from crude draftsmanship, although others regard it as an old and perfectly acceptable variation. A regularly encountered variation of potent is counter-potent or potent-counter-potent (Ger. Gegensturzkrückenfeh), which is produced in the same fashion as counter-vair; potent in point (Ger. Verschobenes Gegensturzkrückenfeh, "displaced counter-potent") is also found, and there is no reason why one could not, in principle, have potent in bend, potent of four colours, etc.

Potent

Counter-potent

Counter-potenté
gules and or

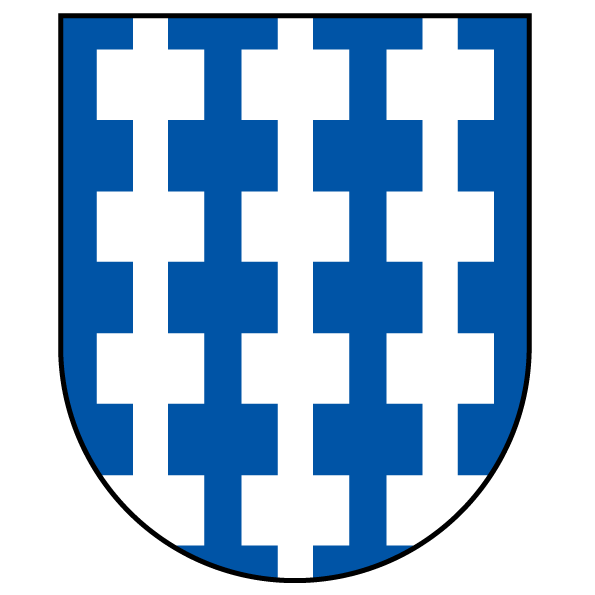
Potent in pale

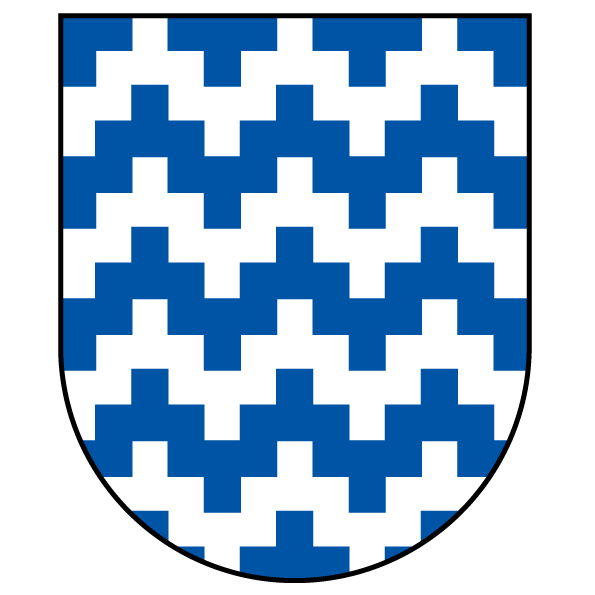
Potent in point

Three other rarer furs are also seen in continental heraldry, of unclear derivation but most likely from variations on vair made to imitate other types of animals. In plumeté or plumetty, the panes are depicted as feathers. In papelonné or papellony, they are depicted as scales resembling those of a butterfly's wings, whence the name is derived. In German heraldry there is a fur known as Kürsch, or "vair bellies", consisting of panes depicted hairy and brown. Here the phrase "vair bellies" may be a misnomer, as the belly of the red squirrel is always white, although its summer coat is indeed reddish brown.

Plumeté or and sable

Gules, papelonné or

Kürsch
