= Enguerrand III of Coucy =

Medieval French nobleman

Enguerrand de Coucy
- Lord of Coucy
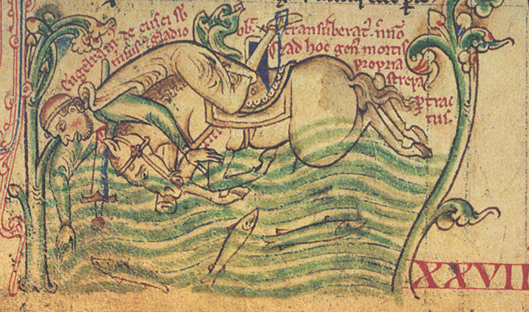
- Death of Enguerrand III, Lord of Coucy
- Tenure: 1191–1242
- Predecessor: Ralph I, Lord of Coucy
- Successor: Raoul II, Lord of Coucy
- Born: c. 1182; Marle, Picardy, France
- Died: 1242; Coucy, Picardy, France
- Residence: Château de Coucy
- Spouses: Beatrix de Vignory; Matilda of Saxony; Marie de Montmirail
- Issue: Raoul II, Lord of Coucy; Enguerrand IV, Lord of Coucy; John de Coucy, Lord of Amboise; Marie, Queen of Scotland; Alix de Coucy, Countess of Guînes
- Parents: Ralph I, Lord of Coucy; Alix de Dreux

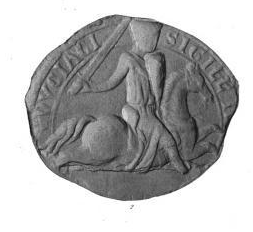
Seal of Enguerrand III of Coucy

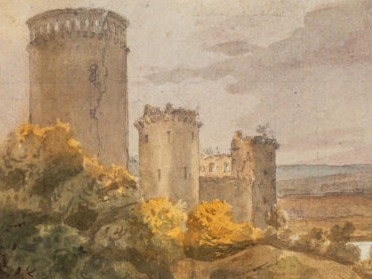
Coucy Castle, watercolor, c. 1820 (Bibliothèque Nationale, Paris)

Enguerrand III de Boves, Lord of Coucy (c. 1182 – 1242) was a medieval French nobleman. The eldest son and successor of Ralph I, Lord of Coucy (c. 1134 – 1191) and Alix de Dreux, he succeeded as Lord of Coucy (sieur de Couci) in 1191, and held it until his death; he was also lord of Marle and Boves.

== Biography ==
Enguerrand III was born in Marle, Picardy, France. He became one of the most ambitious and powerful of all the French nobles, called by one historian "the greatest baron in all Picardy", and earning himself his epithet, Enguerrand le Grand, or Enguerrand "the Great".

Enguerrand had an illustrious military career, helping King Philip II of France reduce the French territories of the King of England. Enguerrand campaigned in Anjou in 1205, and in 1214, fought in the French victory over an Anglo-German alliance at the Battle of Bouvines led by Philip II Augustus. His arms at Bouvines were blazoned: Barry of six vair and gules. He was a notable member of the French force which invaded the Kingdom of England (1216–1217) to depose King John. He also participated in the Albigensian Crusade.

After the death of King Louis VIII of France, Enguerrand was chief among the nobles who resisted the regency of Blanche of Castile for her son Louis IX of France, although he eventually returned to the royal favor. Enguerrand made his mark on the Picardy landscape by constructing Coucy Castle.

Enguerrand is said by tradition to have started the famous rhyme associated with his successors:

Je suis ni roi, ni prince, ni comte aussi: Je suis le sire de Coucy!	I am not king nor prince nor count either: I am the Sire of Coucy!

== Relations ==
Through his mother Alix de Dreux, Enguerrand III was related to King Louis IX of France. Enguerrand also married into the family of King Henry III of England, taking as his second wife the latter king's cousin, who was the granddaughter of King Henry II of England.

He married three times.

His first wife was Beatrice de Vignory, widow of John I, Count of Roucy (1196–1200). They married in 1201. There are no known children from this marriage.

His second wife was Matilda of Saxony, a daughter of Henry the Lion, Duke of Bavaria and Saxony, by his second wife, Matilda of England, daughter of King Henry II. Matilda of Saxony was thus also the niece of King Richard the Lion-hearted. This marriage took place in 1204. There are no known children from this marriage.

His third wife was Marie de Montmirail, daughter of Jean de Montmirail, Lord of Condé . At the end of the 12th century, Enguerrand built the original Château de Condé in Condé, Picardy, constructed as a "keep" which had 2 meters thick walls and towering chimneys. Enguerrand and Marie had five children:

- Raoul II, Lord of Coucy, married Philippe of Dammartin, the daughter of Simon of Dammartin, Count of Ponthieu.
- Enguerrand IV, Lord of Coucy, married 1) Margaret of Gueldres, daughter of Otto II, Count of Guelders, and 2) Joan of Flanders, daughter of Robert III, Count of Flanders.
- John de Coucy, Lord of Amboise (d. 1245)
- Marie de Coucy, married King Alexander II of Scotland.
- Alix de Coucy, married Arnould III, Count of Guînes (1233–1283). Their son, Enguerrand V, inherited the title Lord of Coucy, after his uncles died.

In 1242, Enguerrand III died by falling off of his horse onto his sword at Coucy, Picardy. He was succeeded by his eldest son, Raoul II.

== Notes ==
Preceded by Raoul I	Lord of Coucy; 1191–1241	Succeeded by Raoul II
