= Marie de Coucy =

Queen of Scotland from 1239 to 1249

Queen consort of Alba (Scotland)
- Tenure: 1239–1249
- Born: c. 1218; France
- Died: 1285; France
- Burial: Newbattle Abbey, Scotland
- Spouses: Alexander II of Scotland (m. 1239; died 1249) John of Brienne (m. 1257; sep. 1268)
- Issue: Alexander III of Scotland
- House: Coucy
- Father: Enguerrand III, Lord of Coucy
- Mother: Marie de Montmirail

Marie de Coucy (c. 1218 – 1285) was Queen of Alba by marriage to King Alexander II. She was a member of the royal council during the two last years of the minority of her son, Alexander III, in 1260–1262.

== Background ==
Marie was the daughter of Lord Enguerrand III of Coucy and his third wife, Marie de Montmirel (fr) (1192 – 1267) and a great-great granddaughter of King Louis VI of France. According to the chronicler Matthew Paris, she was beautiful and very wealthy. In 1238, King Alexander II of Scotland needed to remarry after the death of his first childless spouse, Joan of England. King Henry III of England claimed sovereignty over Scotland, which was opposed by Alexander, who wished to make an alliance with France against England. Enguerrand III was a powerful French vassal and a known enemy of England, and the marriage between Marie and Alexander II was regarded as a French-Scottish alliance against England.

== Queenship ==
On 15 May 1239 Marie married Alexander II of Scotland in Roxburgh. The marriage brought an alliance between the Scots and the Coucy lordship, and for the rest of the 13th century they exchanged soldiers and money. She brought a large train of French followers to Scotland. In her retinue was her chancellor Richard Vairement and her nephew Enguerrand de Guines, who came to have some influence in Scottish affairs. Her nephew married Christiane de Lindsay, a niece of John Balliol, and thus became a Scottish magnate. Two years after her marriage, she gave birth to the future king, Alexander III.

King Alexander II died on 8 July 1249 during an expedition against the lord of Argyll on the island of Kerrera. Immediately after the news reached her, Queen Marie made sure her 8-year-old son was crowned as soon as possible at Scone. Although her son was a minor and was placed under regency, Marie did not become regent. On 9 June 1250 Marie and Alexander III were present in Dunfermline for the observance of the canonisation of Saint Margaret of Scotland and the transference of her remains to the new shrine.

== Later life ==
In autumn 1250 Marie returned to Picardy and, for the rest of her life, she divided her time between France and Scotland. In 1252 she attended the wedding in York Minster of her son Alexander III and Margaret of England with a great entourage of French and Scottish nobles. In 1256 or 1257 Marie married John of Brienne (1227–1296), grand butler of France. They had no children together.

In 1260 the rivalries between the Scottish factions for influence during the minority of her son made the situation in Scotland critical, and Marie and her husband were therefore named members of the royal council during the remaining years of the king's minority, until Alexander III was declared of legal majority in 1262. In 1268 Marie separated from John and returned to Scotland. When her daughter-in-law, Margaret, died in February 1275, Marie arranged the new marriage between her son and Yolande of Dreux. In 1275–76, she made a pilgrimage to the shrine of St. Thomas Becket in Canterbury.

Marie de Coucy died in the summer of 1285 and was buried in a tomb she had constructed in Newbattle Abbey.

== Notes ==
Scottish royalty
Preceded by Joan of England	Queen consort of Scotland; 1239–1249	Succeeded by Margaret of England
