= Ralph I of Coucy =

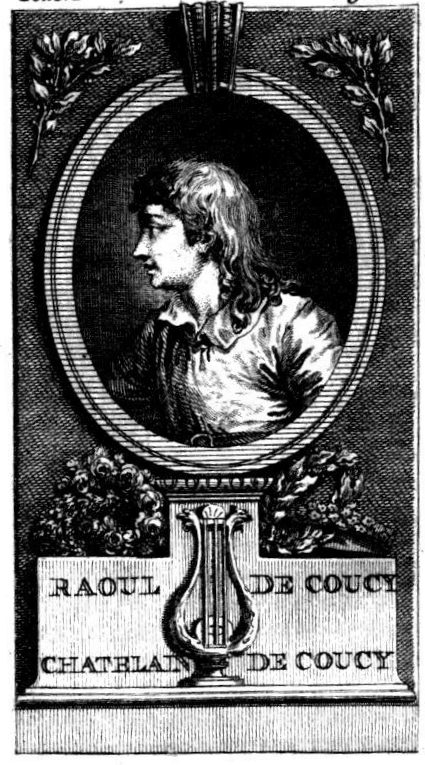
Ralph of Coucy

Ralph of Coucy, (c. 1134 – 1191) Lord of Coucy, Lord of Marle, La Fère, Crécy, Vervins, Pinon, Landouzy, and Fontaine. He was the son of Enguerrand II, Lord of Coucy and Agnes de Beaugency.

== Family ==
Ralph married Agnes of Hainaut, daughter of Baldwin IV, Count of Hainaut. They had:

- Ada, married Dirk van Beveren
- Yolande, married Robert II of Dreux

Ralph married the second time to Alix II of Dreux, daughter of Robert I, Count of Dreux and Hawise, countess of Perche. (Note: M.A. Pollock indicates Alix was the daughter of Robert and his second wife Agnes) They had:

- Enguerrand III, Lord of Coucy (d. 1243)
- Thomas, lord of Vervines (d. 1252/3)
- Agnes (d. 1214)
- Robert, lord of Pinon

By his later marriage, Ralph became cousin to Philip II of France. He attended the King of France in 1181 during the war against Philip I, Count of Flanders. He left for the Holy Land, where he died in the siege of Acre in November 1191.

== Sources ==
- Guyotjeannin, Olivier, ed. (2000). Le chartrier de l'abbaye prémontrée de Saint-Yved de Braine (1134-1250). Ecole des Chartes.
- Leson, Richard A. (2015). "A Constellation of Crusade: The Resafa Heraldry Cup and the Aspirations of Raoul I, Lord of Coucy". In Lapina, Elizabeth; Morris, April Jehan; Throop, Susanna A; Whatley, Laura J (eds.). The Crusades and Visual Culture. Ashgate Publishing.
- Painter, Sidney (2019). The Scourge of the Clergy: Peter of Dreux, Duke of Brittany. Johns Hopkins University Press.
- Pollock, M. A. (2015). Scotland, England and France After the Loss of Normandy, 1204-1296: Auld Amitie. Boydell & Brewer.

Preceded by Enguerrand II	Lord of Coucy; 1149(?) – 1191	Succeeded by Enguerrand III
