= Guillaume I de Coucy =

14th-century French nobleman

- Arms of Guillaume de Coucy: Barry of six, vair and gules
- Born: c. 1288
- Died: 1335 (aged 46–47)

Sir Guillaume I de Coucy (Note: Also William de Coucy.) (died 1335) was a 14th-century French nobleman. He was Lord of Coucy, Oisy, La Fère, Marle and Montmirail.

== Biography ==
Guillaume was the son of Enguerrand V de Coucy and Christine de Lindsay.

== Marriage and issue ==
Guillaume married secondly Isabelle, daughter of Guy IV de Chatillon and Marie de Bretagne, they are known to have had the following known issue.

- Enguerrand VI de Coucy (died 25 August 1346), Lord of Coucy, Marle, La Fère, Oisy and Montmirail, married Katharine of Austria, had issue.
- William II de Coucy (died 6 February 1342), Lord of Wyresdale, Lancashire and other lands in England, married Joan de Strother, died without issue.
- Jean de Coucy (died c.1357), Lord of Havrincourt, without issue.
- Raoul de Coucy (died 1389), Lord of Montmirail, La Ferté-Gaucher, Encre and Bailleul, married Jeanne de Harcourt, had issue.
- Aubert de Coucy, Lord of Drosnay, Droizy and Romeny, married Jeanne de Villesavoir, had issue.
- Guy de Coucy, died without issue.
- Jeanne de Coucy, married Gaucher de Chatillon, Vicomte de Blaigny; had issue:
- Marguerite de Coucy
- Catherine de Coucy
- Marie de Coucy
- Isabelle de Coucy

== Sources ==
- Pollock, M.A. (2015). Scotland, England and France After the Loss of Normandy, 1204-1296: "Auld Amitie". The Boydell Press. ISBN 978-1-84383-992-7.
- Roger, Paul (1843). Noblesse et chevalerie du comté de Flandre, d'Artois et de Pacardie (in French). Duval et Herment. p. 38. "Sires de coucy fascé de vair et de gueules."
