= Baldwin III of Guînes =

Baldwin III, Count of Guînes (1198–1244) was a Flemish nobleman. He inherited the war-torn County of Guînes, now in northern France, while Philip II of France was still on the throne and suffered the repercussions of Philip's expansion of the French state. He is now best known as a mercenary leader in the Welsh Marches, employed by Henry III of England in 1233–1234; the family connections with properties held in England was longstanding.

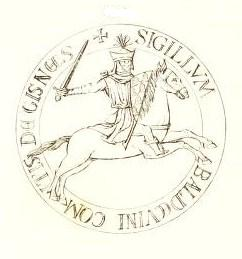
Baldwin's seal, attached to a charter of 1240.

== Early life ==
Baldwin (French: Baudouin) was the son of Arnoul II, Count of Guînes and Beatrix of Bourbourg, born at Ardres about 1198. Beatrix and her husband were on opposite sides during the War of Bouvines, or at least at cross purposes. The period saw multiple invasions of the County, in particular from Renaud I, Count of Dammartin, and heavy damage from Philip II of France, to whom Arnoul was allied. Beatrix took Baldwin to Flanders about 1214; later he was able to effect a reconciliation with his father.

Baldwin succeeded his father Arnoul II in 1220, aged 22. He quarrelled with his mother Beatrix, who died in 1224 at Bourbourg. He was attacked by Ferdinand, Count of Flanders on his release from prison, where he had been for twelve years confined to the Louvre, since 1214 and the Battle of Bouvines where he had opposed Philip II.

His uncle Baldwin "Le Clerc" was assassinated in 1229. Marie, Countess of Ponthieu mediated: she was a connection by marriage, as well as a grand-daughter of Louis VII of France. In the same year Baldwin accompanied Philip Hurepel (Philip I, Count of Boulogne) in his expedition against the Count of Champagne. This amounted to an act of rebellion, against Blanche of Castile who was acting as regent to Louis IX; the leaders were barons from the north of France, and Baldwin was prominent among them.

== English involvement ==
The connection of the counts with English lands traces back to the Norman Conquest and lands granted to Eustace II, Count of Boulogne. His seneschal Arnulf I of Ardres received six manors from Eustace, all but one in Bedfordshire. At least one of those, Stevington, was in Baldwin's family from the 12th century, and came to be held by his brother Robert. Baldwin resented the treatment of his manor of Newington near Hythe in Kent by Hubert de Burgh, who had appropriated it.

In the latter part of 1233, Baldwin was one of the partisans of Peter des Roches, in the factional strife that opposed des Roches to de Burgh. He was rewarded with some of de Burgh's manors, and for a time recovered Newington. Baldwin acted as castellan of Monmouth Castle, in the name of Henry III of England, with a force of Flemish mercenaries. He was attacked on 25 November 1233 by the forces of Richard Marshal, 3rd Earl of Pembroke. An account of the fighting was given by Roger of Wendover.

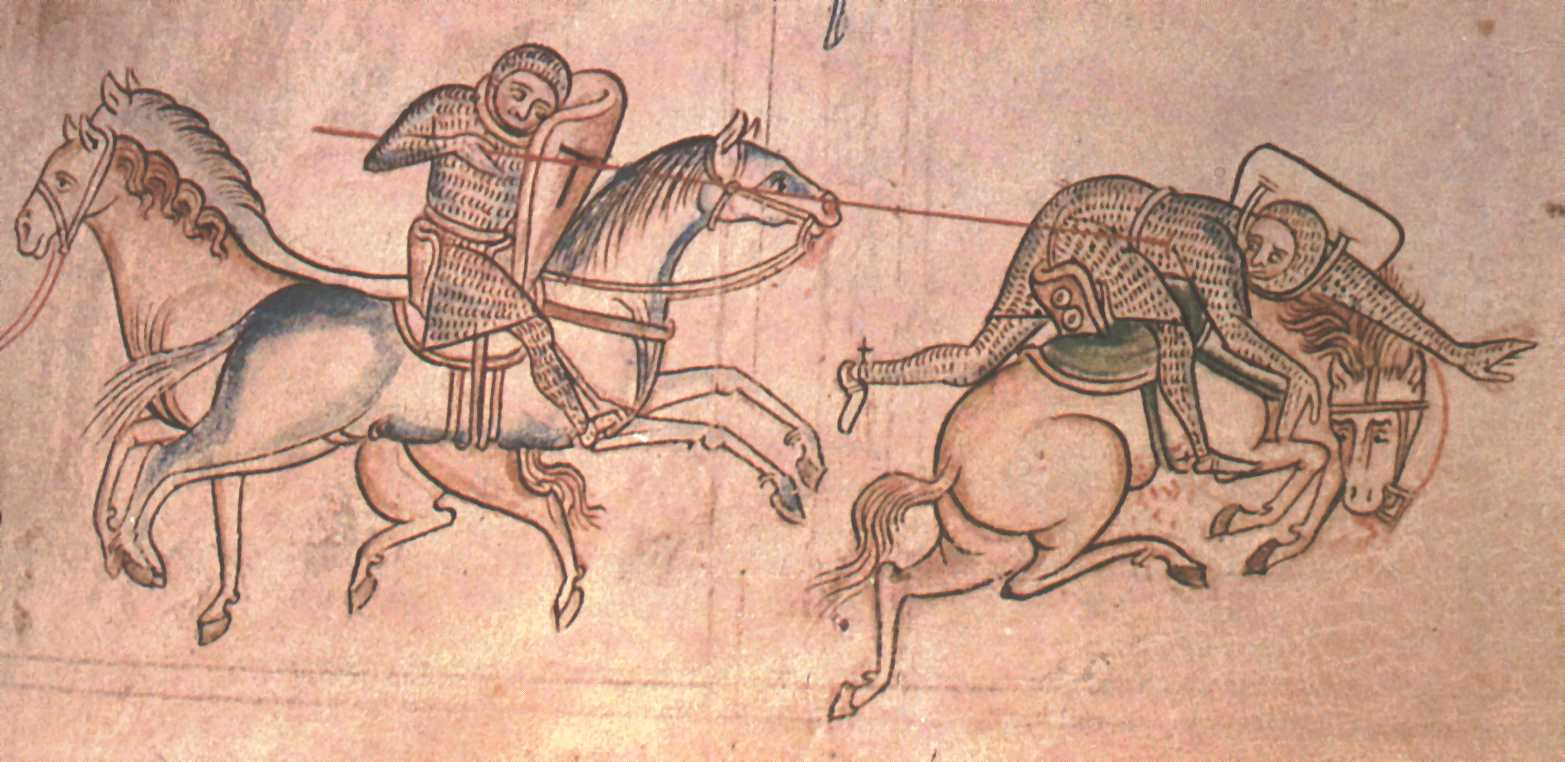
William Marshal, 1st Earl of Pembroke, unhorses Baldwin Guisnes during a joust. Chronica Majora of Matthew Paris.

== Later life ==
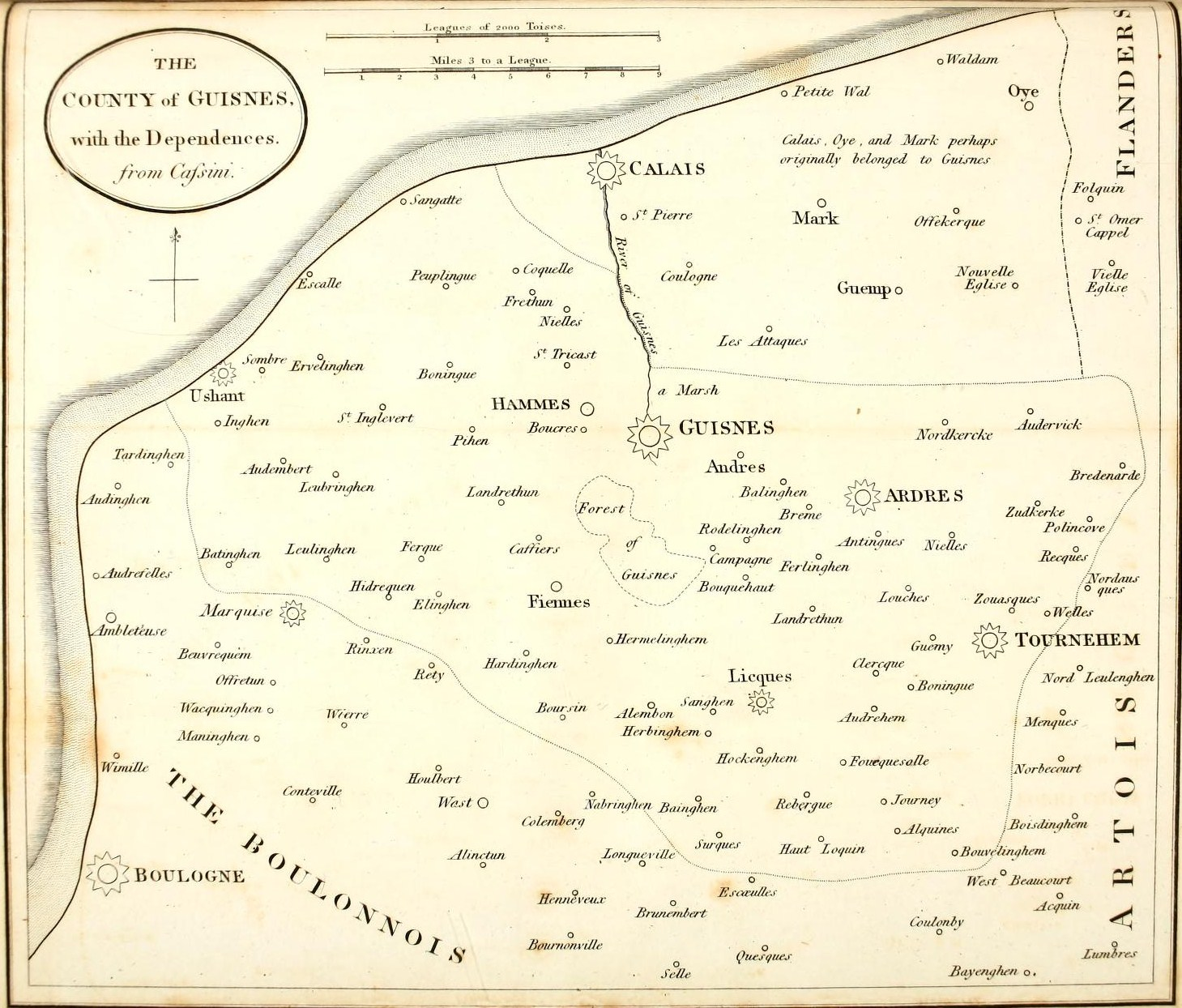
The County of Guînes.

In 1238, Louis IX set up the County of Artois. As part of the new arrangements in the north-east, Guînes became a fief of the French crown. In that year, Baldwin served in Italy, with the force of English and other troops under Henry de Trubleville. Baldwin's sister Mahaut married Hugo V, count of Saint-Pol, as his second wife, in 1241, having most of the fief of Tourcoing as dowry.

Baldwin died in 1244 (or 1245 in some sources), and was succeeded by his son Arnoul of Ardres.

== Family ==
Baldwin married Mahaut, daughter of Guillaume de Fiennes, with whom he had Arnould III, Count of Guînes, and Agnes de Dammartin, who was daughter of Alberic II of Dammartin and so sister to his father's opponent Renaud I, with whom he had four children.
