= Robert De Coucy =

French master-builder

Robert De Coucy or Courcy, born Reims (or Coucy, according to some authorities; died Reims in 1311) was a medieval French master-builder and son of a master-builder of the same name.

In 1263 he was appointed successor to Hugues Libergier as director of the work of building the church of Saint-Nicaise in Reims, and between this date and 1279 he constructed the choir chapels, and part of the transept; the church was afterwards destroyed during the French Revolution. Some illustrations of this building, begun in 1229 and considered one of the best Gothic churches of the period in France, have been preserved; a nearly contemporary chronicle of the Abbey of Saint-Nicaise says that, "Hugo Libergiers pronaon ecclesiæ perfecit. Robert de Coucy caput ecclesiæ construxit".

After the death of his father, Robert de Coucy had also chief charge of the work on the cathedral of Notre-Dame de Reims, which was rebuilt after its destruction by fire in 1211. The new cathedral was begun in 1211, and the choir, constructed by Robert de Coucy the elder, was completed in 1241; The cathedral was built on a simple plan of a vast choir, no transepts, and a rather narrow nave. Viollet-le-Duc says:

"This building has all the strength of the cathedral of Chartres without its heaviness; in short it combines the essential requirements of artistic beauty, power and grace; it is, besides, built of fine materials cunningly put together, and there is found in all its parts a painstaking care and a skill very rare at a period when men built with great rapidity and often with inadequate resources".

In a labyrinth, or representation of a maze, which formerly existed in the pavement of the nave of the cathedral were effigies of the architects of the edifice from its foundation up to 1382; among these effigies, according to tradition, were those of the two Robert de Coucys, father and son. In the cloister of the Abbey of Saint-Denis at Reims, Andre Félibien noted the gravestone of Robert de Coucy, "Maistre de Notre-Daine et de Saint-Nicaise, qui trépassa en l'an 1311".

== Sources ==
- Cites:
  - Guillaume Marlot, Histoire de La ville de Reims (Lille, 1666; Reims, 1842–45), I, 636
