= Lords of Coucy =

French nobles until 1400

De Coucy arms: Barry of six, vair and gules (Fascé de vair et de gueules de six pièces)

The Lords of Coucy (French: sires de Coucy or seigneurs de Coucy), also spelt Couci, were the holders of a medieval lordship based on the barony of Coucy located in the current commune of Coucy-le-Château-Auffrique, Picardy. The château de Coucy was founded by Hervé, archbishop of Rheims, and remained under the fluctuating control of these archbishops for some time until probably the later part of the 10th century. The exact status of Coucy becomes obscure for nearly a century before the emergence of Lord Aubrey, Earl of Northumbria. Though the Lords of Coucy were entitled to the title of baron, they preferred the rarer Sire.

The lords of Coucy became, especially in the 13th century, one of the most powerful sub-comital magnates in western Europe and forged links with royal families, such as those of France, England, Scotland and Austria. The title was eventually absorbed at the end of the 14th century by Louis of Valois, Duke of Orléans.

== List of known lords of Coucy ==
- 1059: Aubrey or Albéric, lord of Coucy. Founder of the abbey of Nogent-sous-Coucy.
- Léon, sire de courcy
- 1079?: Dreux or Dreux de Boves.
- 1080–1116: Enguerrand I known as Enguerrand de Boves, son of predecessor. Count of Amiens.
- 1116–1130: Thomas, or Thomas de Marle; son of predecessor.
- 1130–1149: Enguerrand II known as de Fère or de Marle, lord of Coucy, Marle, Fère, Crécy, Vervins, Pinon, Landousies, Fountains and some other places; son of predecessor, died during the Second Crusade.
- 1149–1191: Raoul I, son of predecessor. Killed during the Third Crusade.
- 1191–1242: Enguerrand III known as the Great, Count of Roucy; son of predecessor. Known also as the "builder", because of his castle construction.
- 1242–1250: Raoul II; son of predecessor; died in the Battle of el-Mansourah.
- 1250 – March 20 [1311]: Enguerrand IV; younger brother of predecessor.
- 1311 – ap. 1321: Enguerrand V, lord of Coucy, Marle and La Fère, Oisy and Havraincourt en Cambrésis, Mont-Mirel, Condé-en-Brie, and Châlons-le-Petit; nephew of his predecessor.
- 1321–1335: Guillaume, lord of Coucy, Marle, La Fère, Oisy and Mont-Mirel; son of his predecessor.
- 1335–1347: Enguerrand VI, lord of Coucy; son of his predecessor.
- 1347 – February 18, 1397: Enguerrand VII , lord of Coucy, earl of Bedford, made count of Soissons by the king of England; son of his predecessor.
- 1397 – November 15, 1400: Mary, daughter of her predecessor.
- November 15, 1400: Louis of Valois, Duke of Orléans purchased the lordship of Coucy.

== See also ==
- Château de Coucy
