= Arnould III of Guînes =

13th century French nobleman

Arnould III, Count of Guînes

Count of Guînes
- Reign: c. 1222–1283
- Predecessor: Baldwin III, Count of Guînes
- Successor: Baldwin IV, Count of Guînes
- Died: 1283
- Spouse: Alix de Coucy
- Issue: Baldwin; Enguerrand V; Jean; Marguerite; Isabeau; Alix; Beatrix
- House: House of Guînes
- Father: Baldwin III, Count of Guînes
- Mother: Mahaut de Fiennes

Arnould III, Count of Guînes (c. 1222–1283) was a French nobleman. He was castellan of Bourbourg, lord of Ardres, Tourcoing and Aalst.

== Biography ==
Arnould was the eldest son of Baldwin III, Count of Guînes and Mahaut de Fiennes. He succeeded his father by January 1245.

He went to England to pay homage to Henry III of England, for lands held in England, he was arrested by Roger Bigot, Earl of Norfolk, in retaliation for when Arnould had arrested Bigod in 1245. Louis IX of France meditated his release, with an agreement that Arnould will remove the tolls he had installed.

Arnould provided homage to Robert I, Count of Artois. He supported Theobald II, Count of Bar as part of Guy, Count of Flanders succession campaign against William II of Holland.

Captured during the battle of Westkapelle on 4 July 1253, Arnould was forced to pay a large ransom for his release. He was forced to sell his castle of Montoire to the Count of Artois in May 1281 and then the County of Guînes to Philip III of France in February 1283 for 3,000 livres and a life annuity of 1,000 livres.

Arnould died shortly afterwards in 1283. The County of Guînes was returned to his eldest son Baldwin in 1295.

== Marriage and issue ==
Arnould married Alix, daughter of Enguerrand III de Coucy and Marie de Montmirail, dame of Oisy. They are known to have had the following issue:

- Baudouin IV (died 1295), Count of Guînes and lord of Ardres, married Catherine de Monchy, had issue.
- Enguerrand de Guines, Lord of Coucy, succeeded his uncle as the lord of Coucy, Montmirail and Oisy, raised at the court of Alexander III of Scotland. He married Christiana de Lindsay, had issue.
- Jean de Guînes, Viscount of Meaux, married Jeanne de Chantilly, dame of Senlis, had issue.
- Marguerite (or Margaret) de Guînes, married Richard Óg de Burgh, Knt., Earl of Ulster, lord of Connaught, and had issue.
- Isabeau de Guines, married Gaucher de Bazoches, without issue.
- Alix de Guînes, dame of Tourcoing, married Wouter VII Berthout van Mechelen, had issue.
- Béatrix de Guînes, abbess of the Abbey of Sainte-Colombe, Blendecques.
