= Enguerrand V de Coucy =

Enguerrand V

Lord of Coucy
- Reign: 1311–1323
- Predecessor: Enguerrand IV, Lord of Coucy
- Successor: Guillaume I de Coucy
- Burial: Prémontré Abbey, Aisne, France.
- Spouse: Christiana Lindsay
- Issue: Guillaume I de Coucy; Enguerrand; Baudouin; Robert
- House: House of Guînes
- Father: Arnould III, Count of Guînes
- Mother: Alix de Coucy

Enguerrand V, Lord of Coucy (died 1323) inherited the title of Lord of Coucy and castle from his maternal uncle, Enguerrand IV in 1311. He was also lord of Oisy and Montmirail.

== Biography ==
Enguerrand was the second son of Arnould III, Count of Guînes and Alix de Coucy, daughter of Enguerrand III, Lord of Coucy. His father, Arnould, sold the county of Guines to King Louis IX of France, forcing Enguerrand to find his fortune abroad. After arriving in Scotland, he married Christiana Lindsay in Scotland. Christiana was the daughter of William Lindsay and Ada Balliol, sister of John Balliol. Their wedding was arranged by their mutual cousin, King Alexander III of Scotland. Enguerrand was present at the recognition of Margaret as Alexander III's heir and the Treaty of Birgham in 1290.

On 28 May 1283, Enguerrand pledged his service to King Edward I of England. He was summoned to the English Parliament on 21 June 1295, as a Baron (Lord Ghisnes) by writ and had regular summons until 14 March 1321/2.

When Enguerrand's maternal uncle, Enguerrand IV, died without leaving any heirs, the titles and lands of Coucy were passed to Enguerrand.

=== Issue ===
Enguerrand and Christiana had four sons:

- Guillaume de Coucy, Lord of Coucy, Marle, La Fère, Oisy and Montmirel, married Isabeau de Châtillon-Saint-Pol, had issue. Father of Enguerrand VI and grandfather of Enguerrand VII.
- Enguerrand de Coucy, Viscount of Meaux, Lord of La Ferté-Ancoul, Tresmes and Belonnes, married firstly Marie de Vianden, Dame de Rumpt and secondly Allemande Flotte de Revel, had issue.
- Baudouin de Coucy
- Robert de Coucy, Lord of La Ferté-Gaucher.

== Sources ==
- Cokayne, George Edward. The Complete Peerage of England, Scotland, Ireland, Great Britain, and the United Kingdom, Vol. IV (1892).
- Pollock, M.A. (2015). Scotland, England and France After the Loss of Normandy, 1204-1296: Auld Amitie. The Boydell Press.

Preceded by Enguerrand IV	Lord of Coucy; 1311-1321	Succeeded by Guillaume
