= Enguerrand IV de Coucy =

Medieval French nobleman

Enguerrand IV
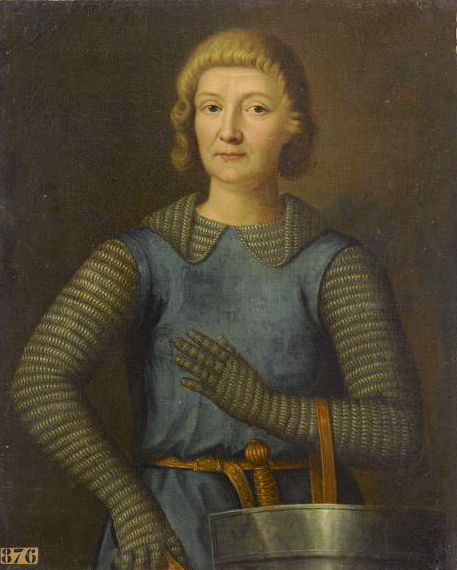

Lord of Coucy
- Reign: 1250–1311
- Predecessor: Raoul II, Lord of Coucy
- Successor: Enguerrand V, Lord of Coucy
- Born: c. 1236
- Died: 1311
- Spouses: Margaret of Guelders; Jeanne of Flanders
- Father: Enguerrand the Great

Enguerrand IV, Lord of Coucy (c. 1236 – 1311) was the son of Enguerrand III, Lord of Coucy and Marie de Montmirail. He succeeded his older brother Raoul II, Lord of Coucy, serving as the Sire de Coucy from his brother's death in 1250 until his own in 1311.

== Biography ==
Enguerrand IV succeeded to the large fief established by his father, Enguerrand the Great, due to his elder brother's death on crusade. Enguerrand IV's rule was notable for his crimes and cruelty, similar to that of his great-great-great grandfather Thomas, Lord of Coucy. Setting an important medieval legal precedent, King Louis IX of France refused to allow him trial by combat for the hanging of three Flemish squires found on his land, and imprisoned him instead in 1259 in the Louvre. In the end, Enguerrand escaped with a fine, and through his wealth remained important to the King, lending him 15,000 livres in 1265 to purchase a piece of the True Cross. He was married twice: his first wife was Margaret of Guelders, daughter of Otto II, Count of Guelders and his second wife was Jeanne of Flanders, daughter of Robert III, Count of Flanders. He had no children by either marriage and was succeeded in 1311 by the second son of his sister, Alix, who became Enguerrand V.

== Sources ==
- Barber, Malcolm (2004). The Two Cities: Medieval Europe 1050–1320 (2nd ed.). Routledge.
- Hallam, Elizabeth; Everard, Judith (2013). Capetian France 987-1328 (2nd ed.). Routledge.
- Leson, Richard A. (2011). "Heraldry and Identity in the Psalter-Hours of Jeanne of Flanders (Manchester, John Rylands Library, MS LAT. 117)". Studies in Iconography. 32: 155-198.
- Pollock, M.A. (2015). Scotland, England and France After the Loss of Normandy, 1204-1296: Auld Amitie. The Boydell Press.
- Vanderkindere, Léon (1899). "Histoire de la formation territoriale des principautés belges au moyen âge : La Flandre". Bulletin de la Commission royale d'Histoire (in French). 9: 1-195.

Preceded by Raoul II	Lord of Coucy; 1250-1311	Succeeded by Enguerrand V
