= Château de Coucy =

13th-century castle in France

- Coucy-le-Château-Auffrique, Picardy, France
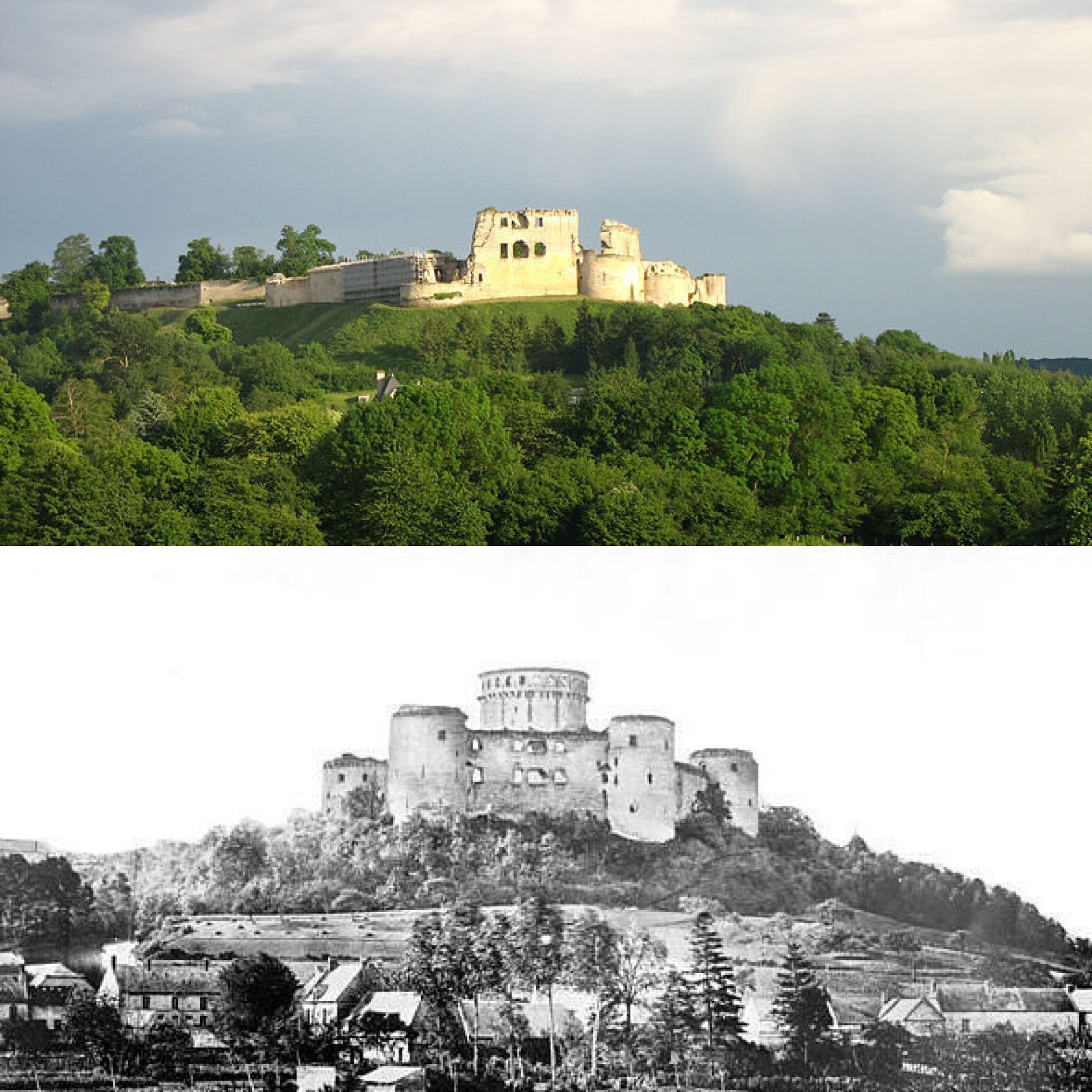
- Château of Coucy, from across the Ailette valley, comparison between 2007 and 1909

Site information
- Type: Medieval castle
- Controlled by: French ministry of culture
- Website: www.chateau-coucy.fr/en

Location
- Coordinates: 49.521667°N 3.318611°E
- Height: 20 meters

Site history
- Built: c. 1220s
- Built by: Enguerrand III, Lord of Coucy
- In use: fortress
- Materials: stone
- Demolished: 1917 by Germans in World War I
- Battles/wars: the Battle of Bouvines.
- Events: Coucy a la merveille

Garrison information
- Occupants: Lords of Coucy

The Château de Coucy (Picard: Câtiau Couchy) is a French castle in the commune of Coucy-le-Château-Auffrique, in Picardy, built in the 13th century and renovated by Eugène Viollet-le-Duc in the 19th century.

During its heyday, until its destruction in 1917, it was famous for the sheer scale of its fortifications, above all its enormous donjon (keep)—the tallest in Europe—and for the pride of its lords, reflected in the staunchly independent rhyme: roi ne suis, ne prince ne duc ne comte aussi; Je suis le sire de Coucy ("I am not king, nor prince nor duke nor count; I am the Lord of Coucy"). By the second half of the 19th century and the early 20th century, it had also become one of the most visited monuments in France, and it was listed as a monument historique in 1862.

The château was occupied by German forces in September 1914 during the First World War. In March 1917, during the German withdrawal to the Hindenburg Line as part of Operation Alberich, the town of Coucy was devastated and the château, including its great keep (donjon) and towers, was deliberately destroyed, leaving it in ruins to this day.

== Background ==
The castle was constructed in the 1220s by Enguerrand III, Lord of Coucy. The castle proper occupies the tip of a bluff or falaise. It forms an irregular trapezoid of 92 x 35 × 50 × 80 m. At the four corners are cylindrical towers 20 m in diameter (originally 40 m in height). Between two towers on the line of approach was the massive donjon (keep). The donjon was the largest in Europe, measuring 35 meters wide and 55 meters tall. The smaller towers surrounding the court were as big as the donjons being built at that time by the French monarchy. The rest of the bluff is covered by the lower court of the castle, and the small town.

Coucy was occupied in September 1914 by German troops during World War I. It became a military outpost and was frequented by German dignitaries, including Emperor Wilhelm II himself. In March 1917 the retreating German army, on order of General Erich Ludendorff, destroyed the keep and the 4 towers. It is not known whether this act had some military purpose or was merely an act of wanton destruction. The destruction caused so much public outrage that in April 1917 the ruins were declared "a memorial to barbarity". War reparations were used to clear the towers and to consolidate the walls but the ruins of the keep were left in place.

One of its lords, Enguerrand VII (1340–1397), is the subject of historian Barbara Tuchman's study of the fourteenth century A Distant Mirror. It also features extensively in British author Anthony Price's 1982 crime–espionage novel The Old Vengeful. Château de Coucy has been listed as a monument historique by the French Ministry of Culture since 1862, and is managed by the Centre des monuments nationaux.

== Gallery ==
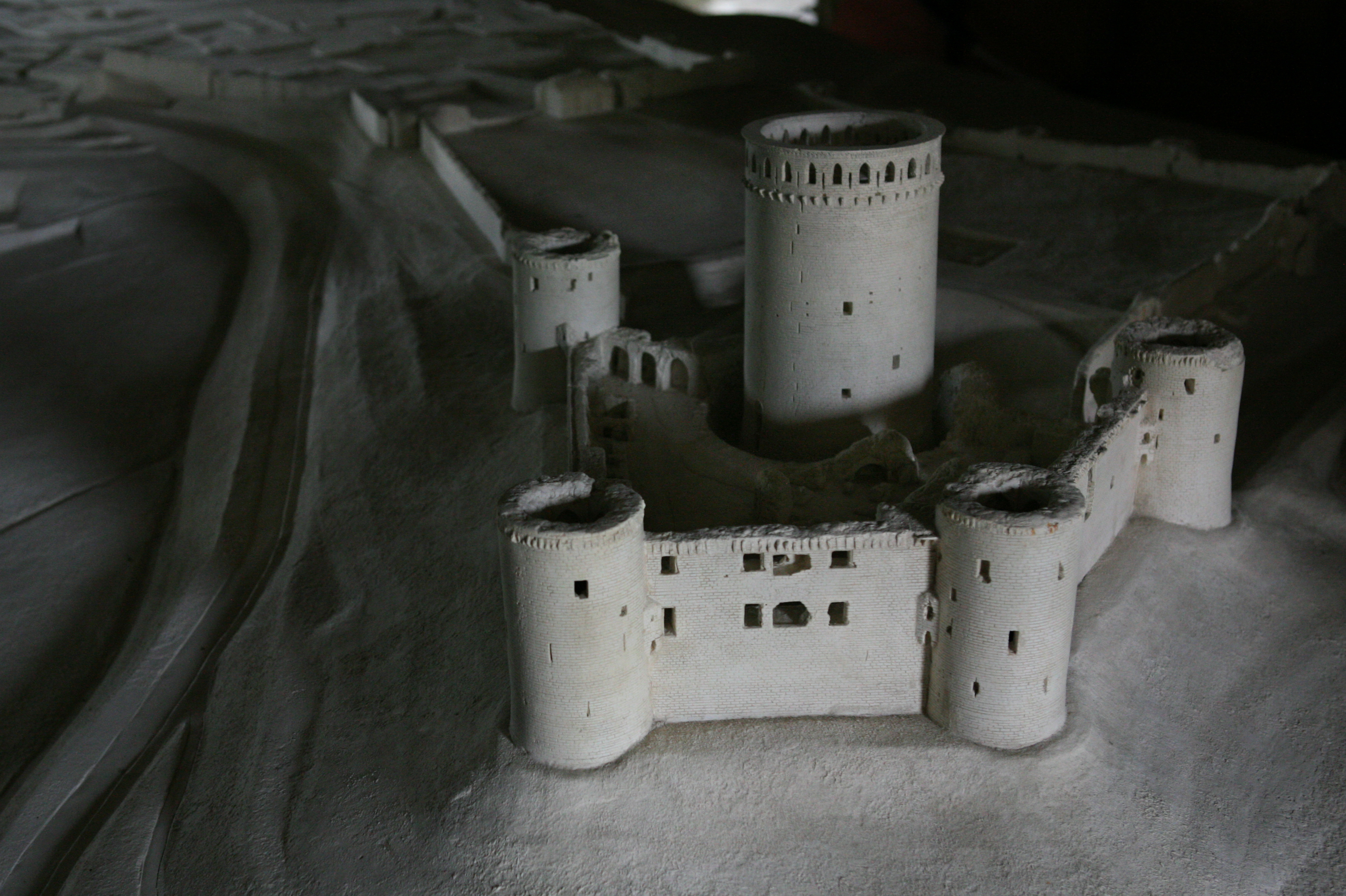
Model of the castle as it looked before 1917

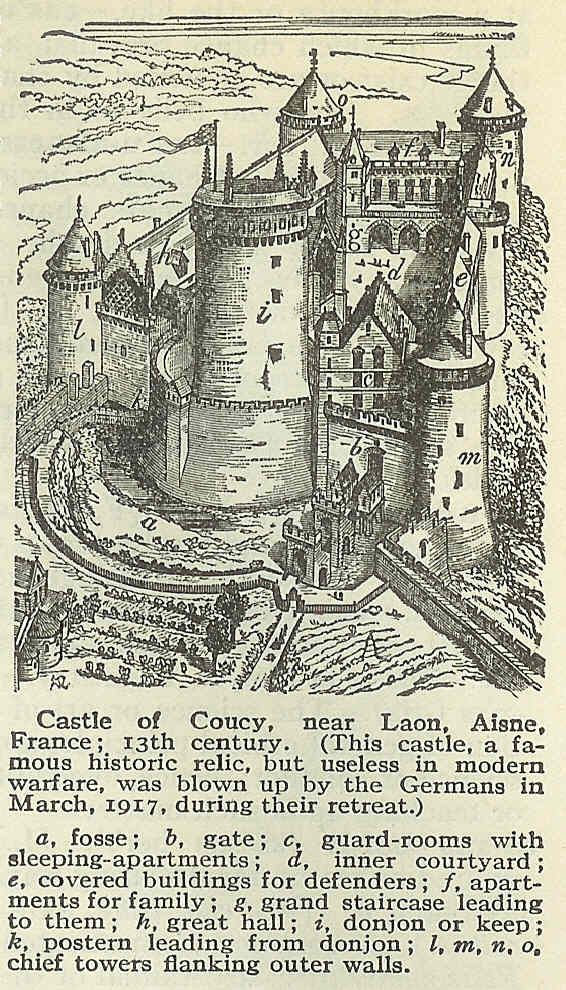
Plate depicts Castle of Coucy in the 13th century, describing architectural features

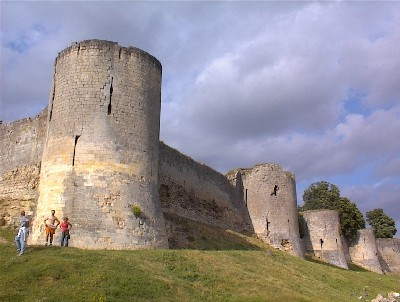
Rampart of the basse-cour

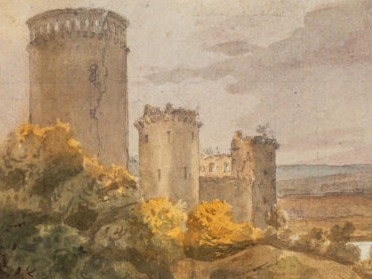
Château of Coucy, watercolor, ca 1820 (Bibliothèque Nationale, Paris)

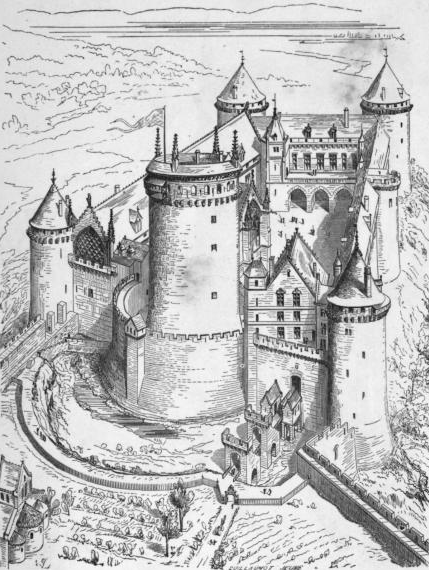
Etching by Eugène Viollet-le-Duc

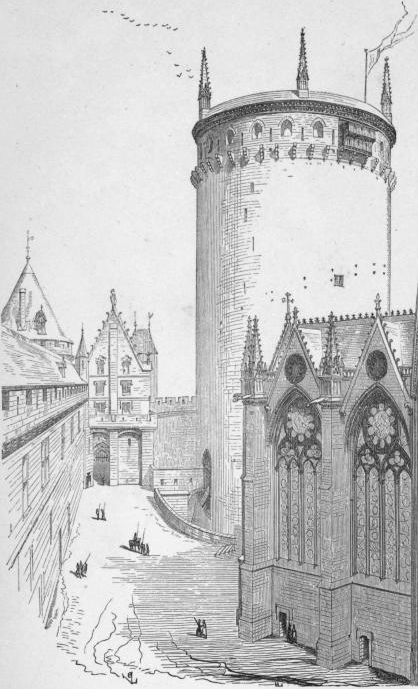
The basse-cour and the donjon by Eugène Viollet-le-Duc

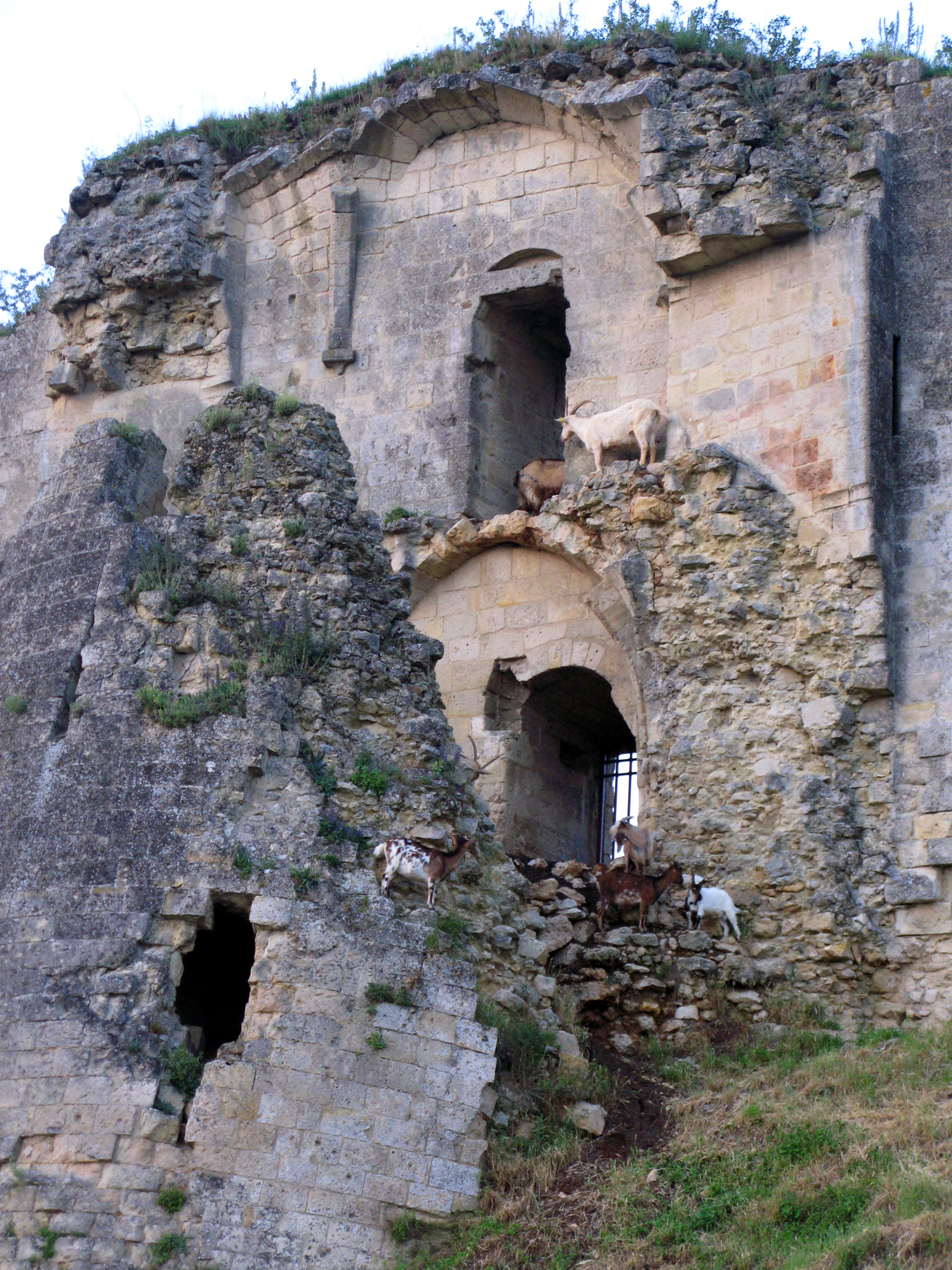
Collapsed tower on the west part of the basse-cour

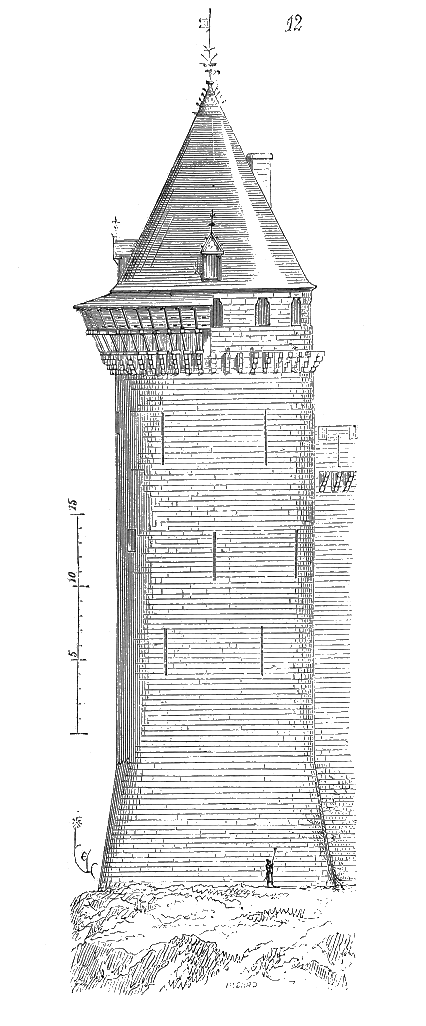
North-west tower of the castle by Eugène Viollet-le-Duc

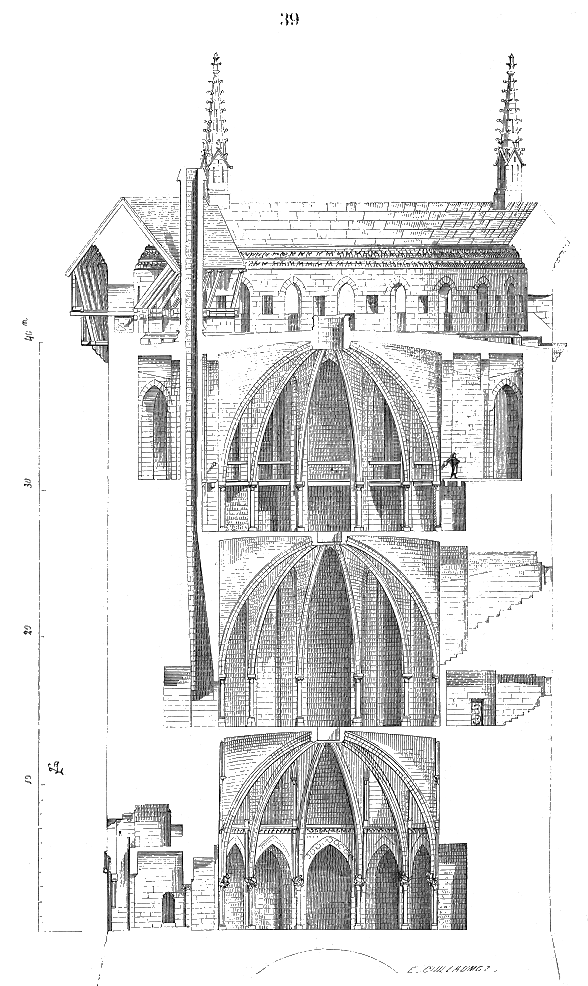
Inside of the donjon, by Eugène Viollet-le-Duc

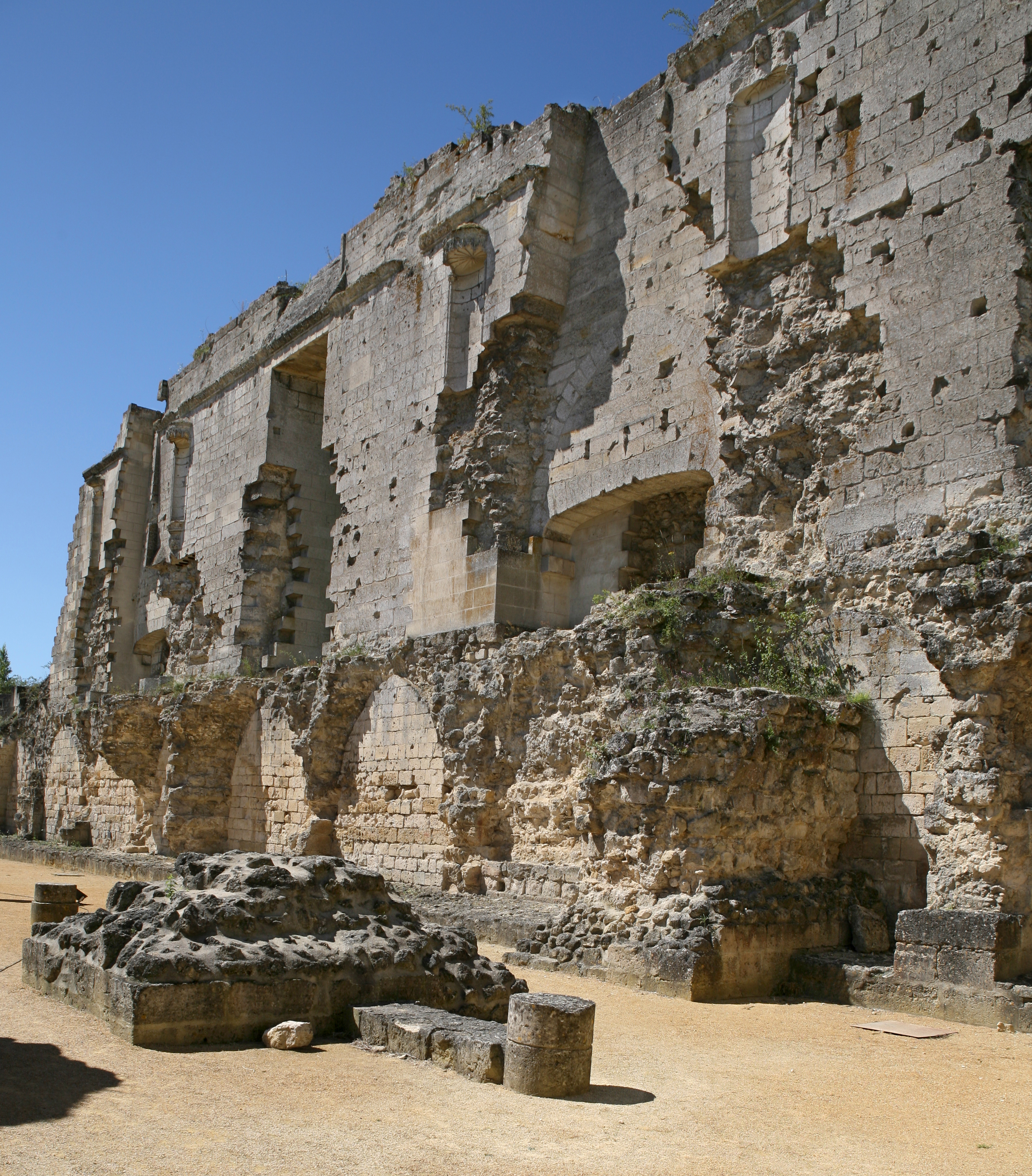
The ruins of the Great Hall in the Château de Coucy

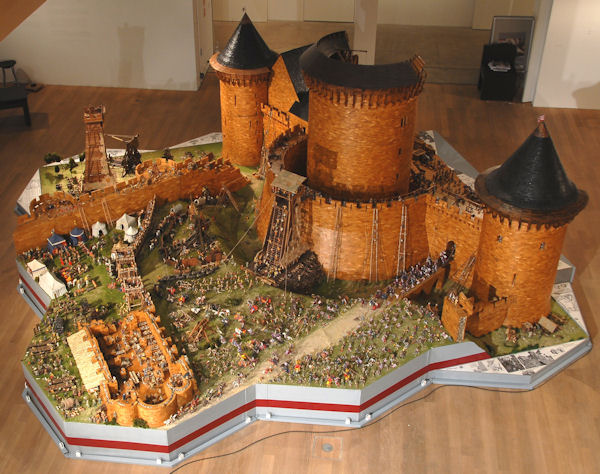
model by the International Castle Research Society

== See also ==
- List of castles in France
- List of tallest structures built before the 20th century

== Bibliography ==
- Corvisier, Christian. Le château de Coucy et l'enceinte de la ville, Itinéraires Picardie. Éditions du Patrimoine, Centre des Monuments Nationaux. ISBN 978-2-85822-882-9.
- de Kay, Ormonde (trans.) N'Heures Souris Rames: The Coucy Castle Manuscript. Angus & Robertson, 1985.
- Laurent, Jean-Marc. Le château féodal de Coucy. La Vague verte, 2001.
- Leson, Richard. "′Partout la figure du lion′: Thomas of Marle and the Enduring Legacy of the Coucy Donjon Tympanum," Speculum 93.1 (2018):27-71.
- Melleville, Maximilien. Histoire de la ville et des sires de Coucy-le-Château. Fleury et A. Chevergny, 1848.
- Mesqui, Jean. Île-de-France Gothique 2: Les demeures seigneuriales. Paris: Picard, 1988; pp. 134–59. ISBN 2-7084-0374-5.
- Mesqui, Jean. Les programmes résidentiels du château de Coucy du XIIIe au XVIe siècle, p. 207-247, dans Congrès archéologique de France. Aisne méridionale, Société française d'archéologie, Paris, 1994.
- Viollet-le-Duc, Eugène. Description du château de Coucy. Bance éditeur, 1861.
