= Raoul II of Coucy =

Raoul II de Coucy
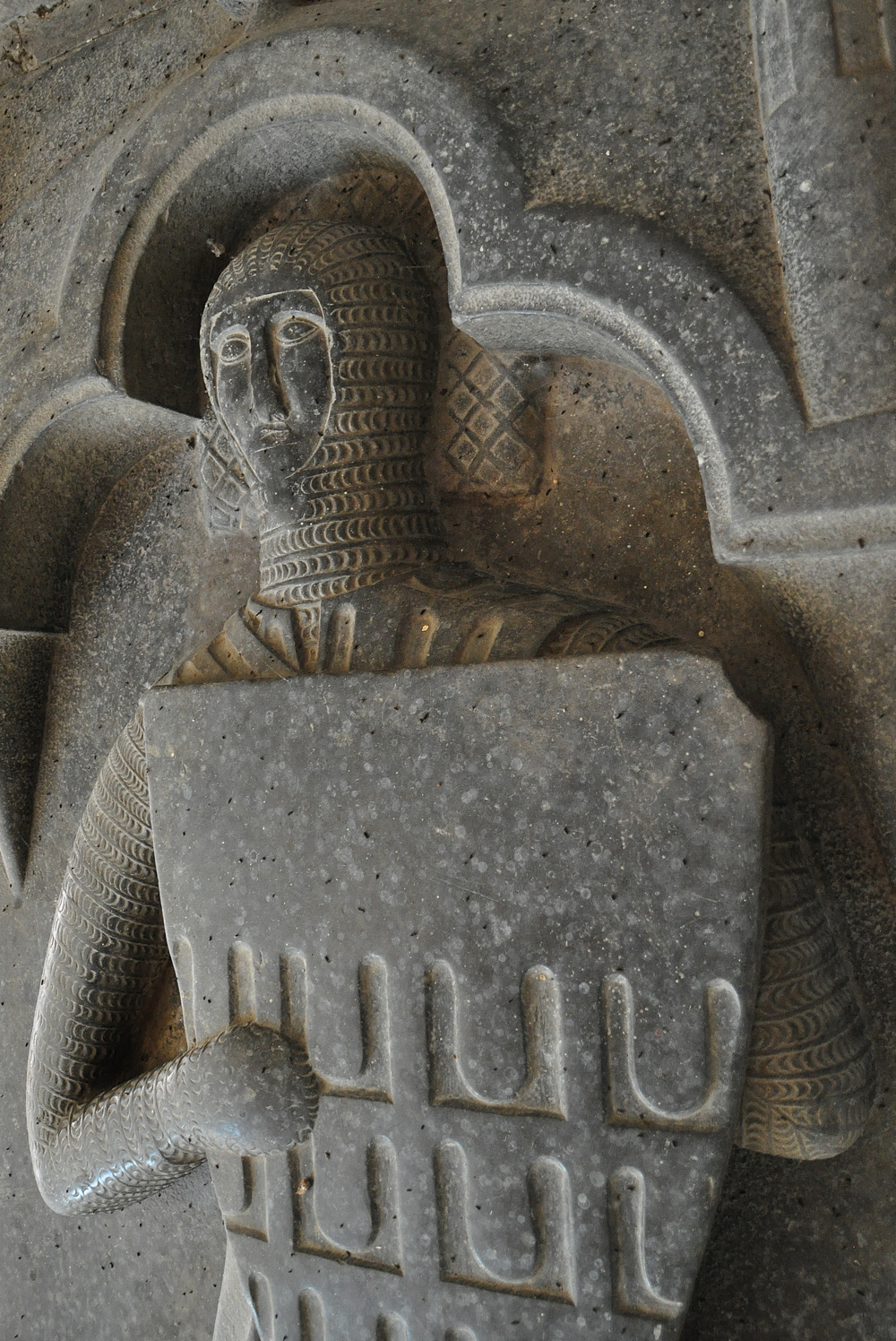
- Born: 1211 C.E. Coucy, France
- Died: 1250 C.E. (38-39); Monsourah, Egypt

Raoul II, Lord of Coucy (died 1250) was a son of Enguerrand III and his wife Marie de Montmirail.

In 1246, Raoul succeeded his father as lord of Coucy. He married Elisabeth, daughter of Walter III of Châtillon, and later remarried to Philippe of Dammartin, daughter of Simon of Dammartin.

Raoul died at the Battle of Mansurah in Egypt during the Seventh Crusade and was succeeded by his younger brother, Enguerrand IV, as lord of Coucy.

== Sources ==
- Jackson, Peter, ed. (2009). The Seventh Crusade, 1244-1254: Sources and Documents. Ashgate Publishing.
- Pollock, M.A. (2015). Scotland, England and France after the Loss of Normandy, 1204-1296. The Boydell Press.
- Richard, Jean (1992). Lloyd, Simon (ed.). Saint Louis, Crusader King of France. Translated by Birrell, Jean. Cambridge University Press.

| Preceded by Enguerrand III | Lord of Coucy; 1241–1250 | Succeeded by Enguerrand IV, Lord de Coucy |
