= Marle, Aisne =

Marle
- Commune
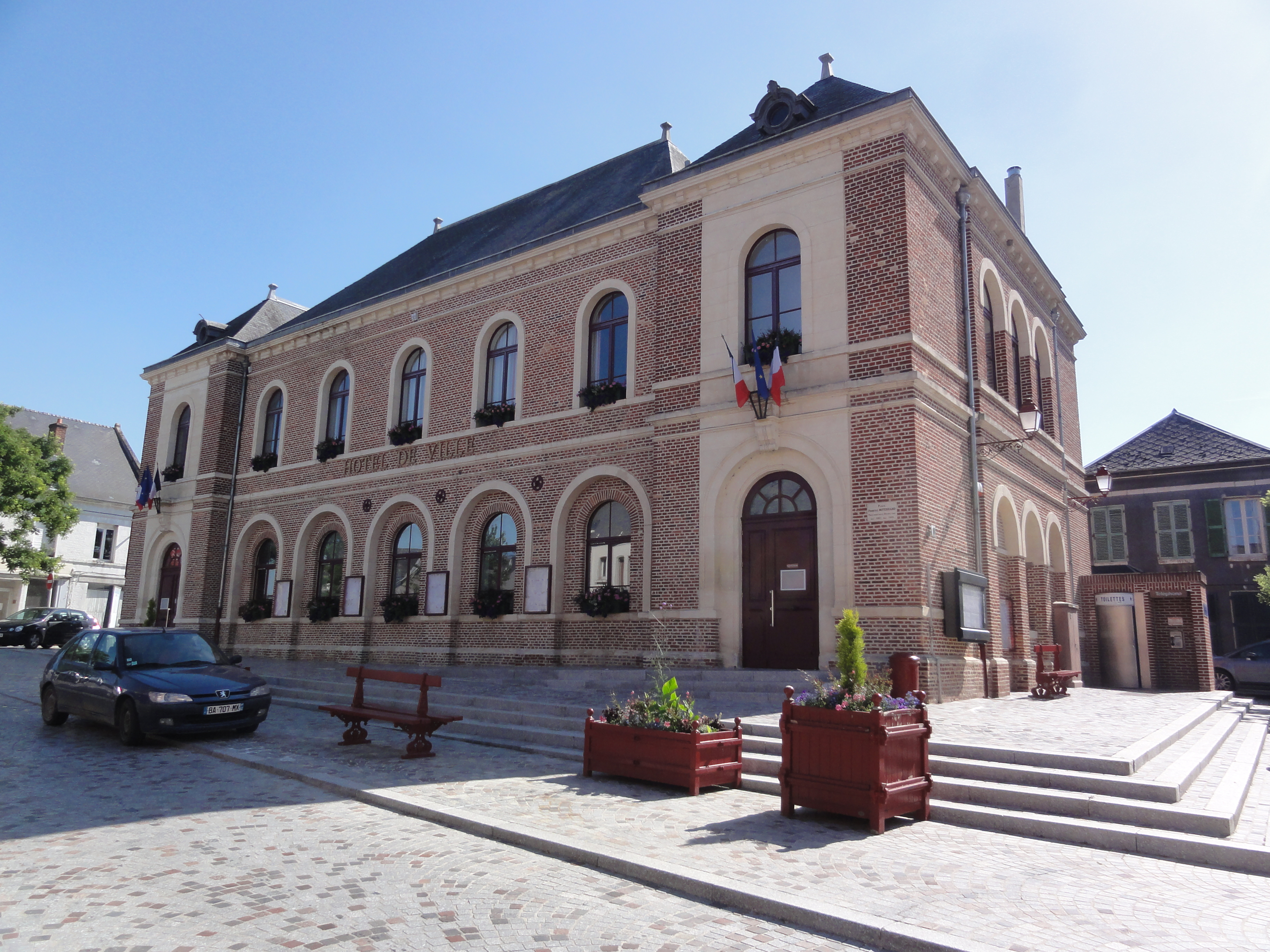
- The town hall of Marle-sur-Serre

- Coat of arms
- Location of Marle
- Location within France Location within Hauts-de-France
- Coordinates: 49°44′24″N 3°46′17″E
- Country: France
- Region: Hauts-de-France
- Department: Aisne
- Arrondissement: Laon
- Canton: Marle
- Intercommunality: Pays de la Serre

Government
  - Mayor (2026–32): Dominique Godbille
- Area^{1}: 13.79 km^{2} (5.32 sq mi)
- Elevation: 85 m (279 ft)
- Highest elevation: 140 m (460 ft)
- Lowest elevation: 75 m (246 ft)
- Population (2023): 2,229
  - Density: 161.6/km^{2} (418.6/sq mi)
- Time zone: UTC+01:00 (CET)
  - Summer (DST): UTC+02:00 (CEST)
- INSEE/Postal code: 02468 /02250
- ^{1} French Land Register data, which excludes lakes, ponds, glaciers > 1 km^{2} (0.386 sq mi or 247 acres) and river estuaries.

Marle (French pronunciation: [maʁl]) is a commune in the Aisne department in Hauts-de-France in northern France.

== Population ==
Historical population

Year	Pop.	±% p.a.
1793	1,212	—
1800	1,328	+1.31%
1806	1,455	+1.53%
1821	1,444	−0.05%
1831	1,433	−0.08%
1836	1,686	+3.31%
1841	1,843	+1.80%
1846	2,051	+2.16%
1851	1,977	−0.73%
1856	1,945	−0.33%
1861	1,900	−0.47%
1866	1,956	+0.58%
1872	2,078	+1.01%
1876	2,357	+3.20%
1881	2,404	+0.40%
1886	2,482	+0.64%
1891	2,509	+0.22%
1896	2,506	−0.02%
1901	2,513	+0.06%

Year	Pop.	±% p.a.
1906	2,584	+0.56%
1911	2,672	+0.67%
1921	2,467	−0.80%
1926	2,511	+0.35%
1931	2,397	−0.92%
1936	2,346	−0.43%
1946	2,508	+0.67%
1954	2,729	+1.06%
1962	2,912	+0.81%
1968	2,848	−0.37%
1975	2,926	+0.39%
1982	2,727	−1.00%
1990	2,669	−0.27%
1999	2,529	−0.60%
2007	2,405	−0.63%
2012	2,360	−0.38%
2017	2,268	−0.79%
2023	2,229	−0.29%

Source: EHESS and INSEE (1968-2023)

== International relations ==
Marle is twinned with Eyemouth, Scotland, UK.

== See also ==
- Communes of the Aisne department
- fr:Cyclo-cross international de Marle, in French Wikipedia
