= Coucy-le-Château-Auffrique =

- Commune
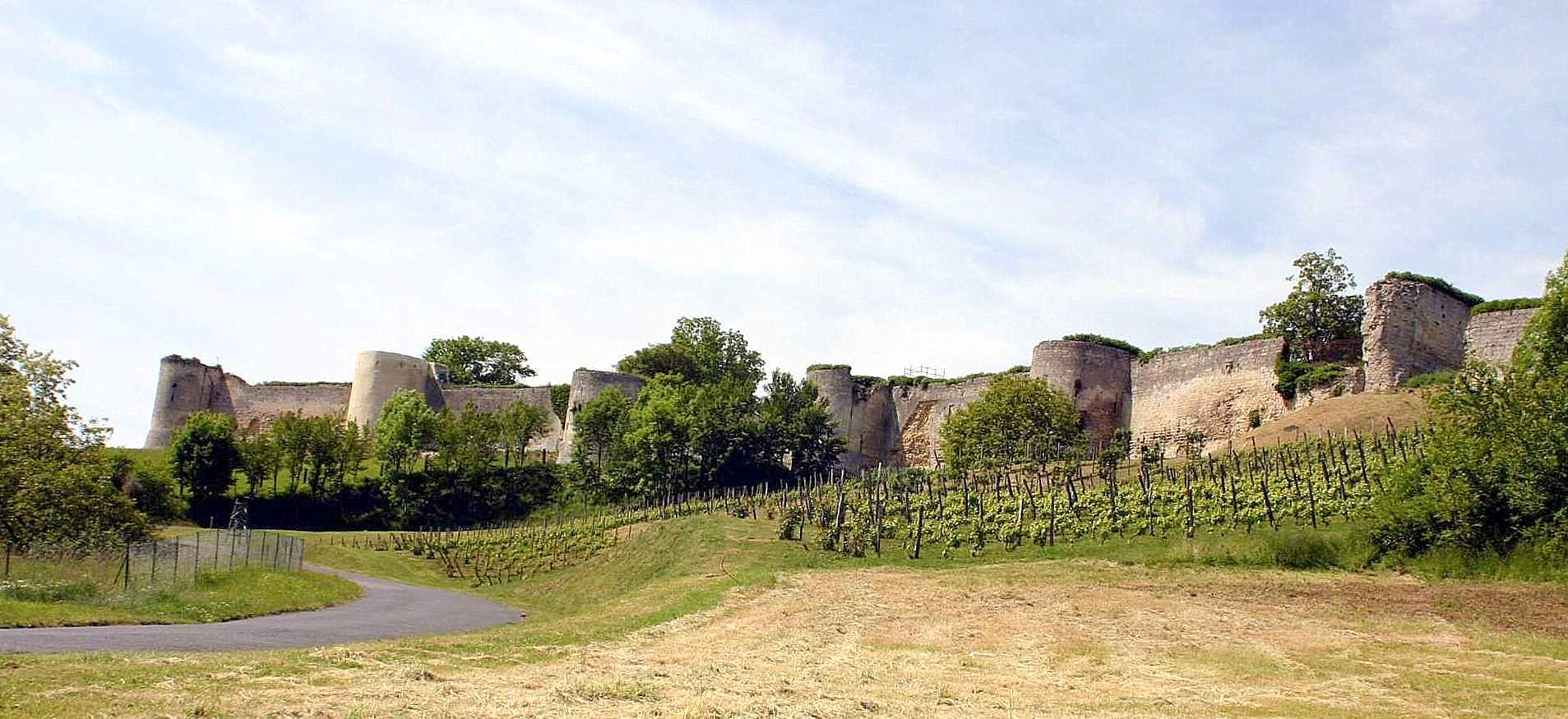
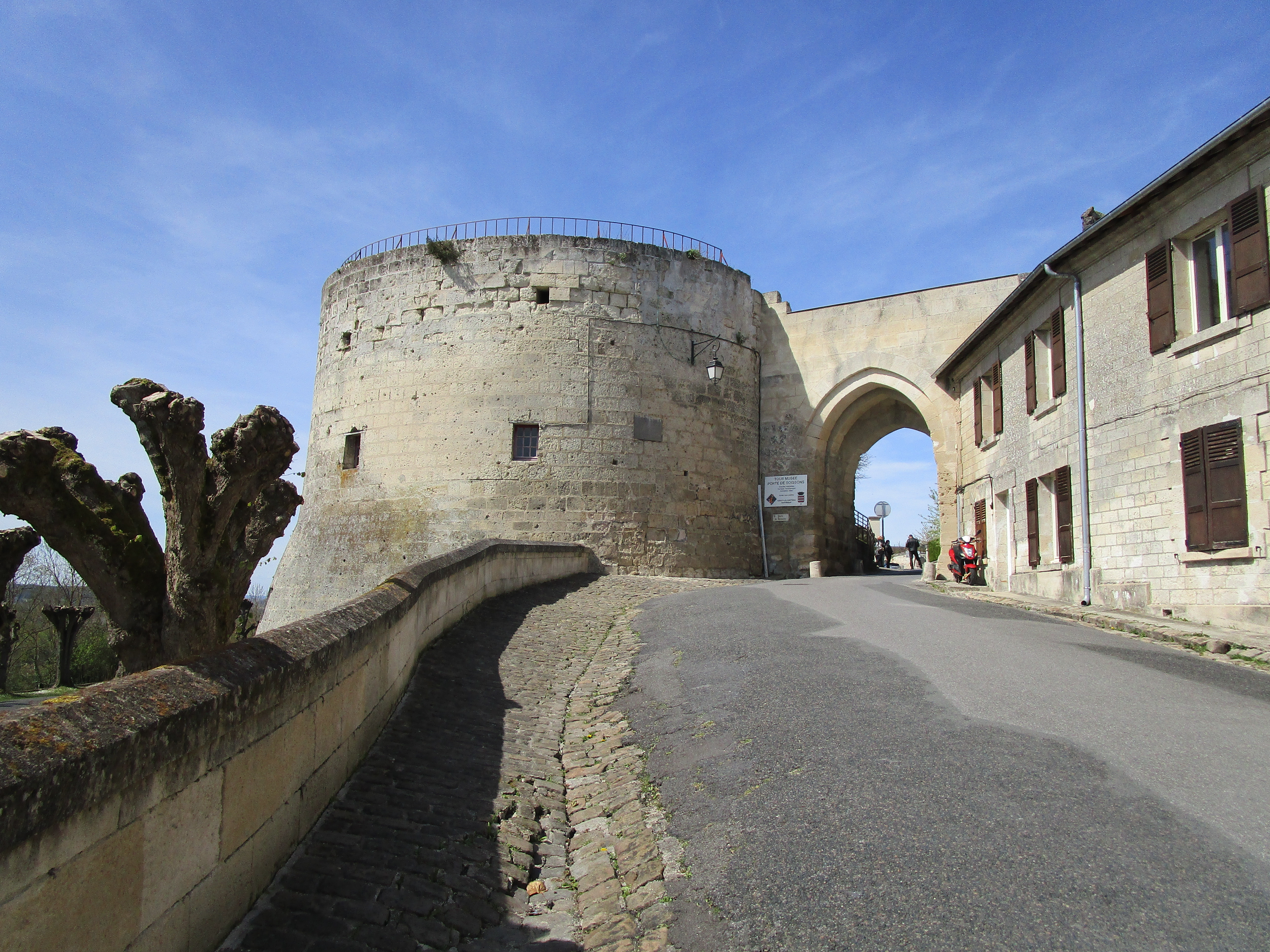
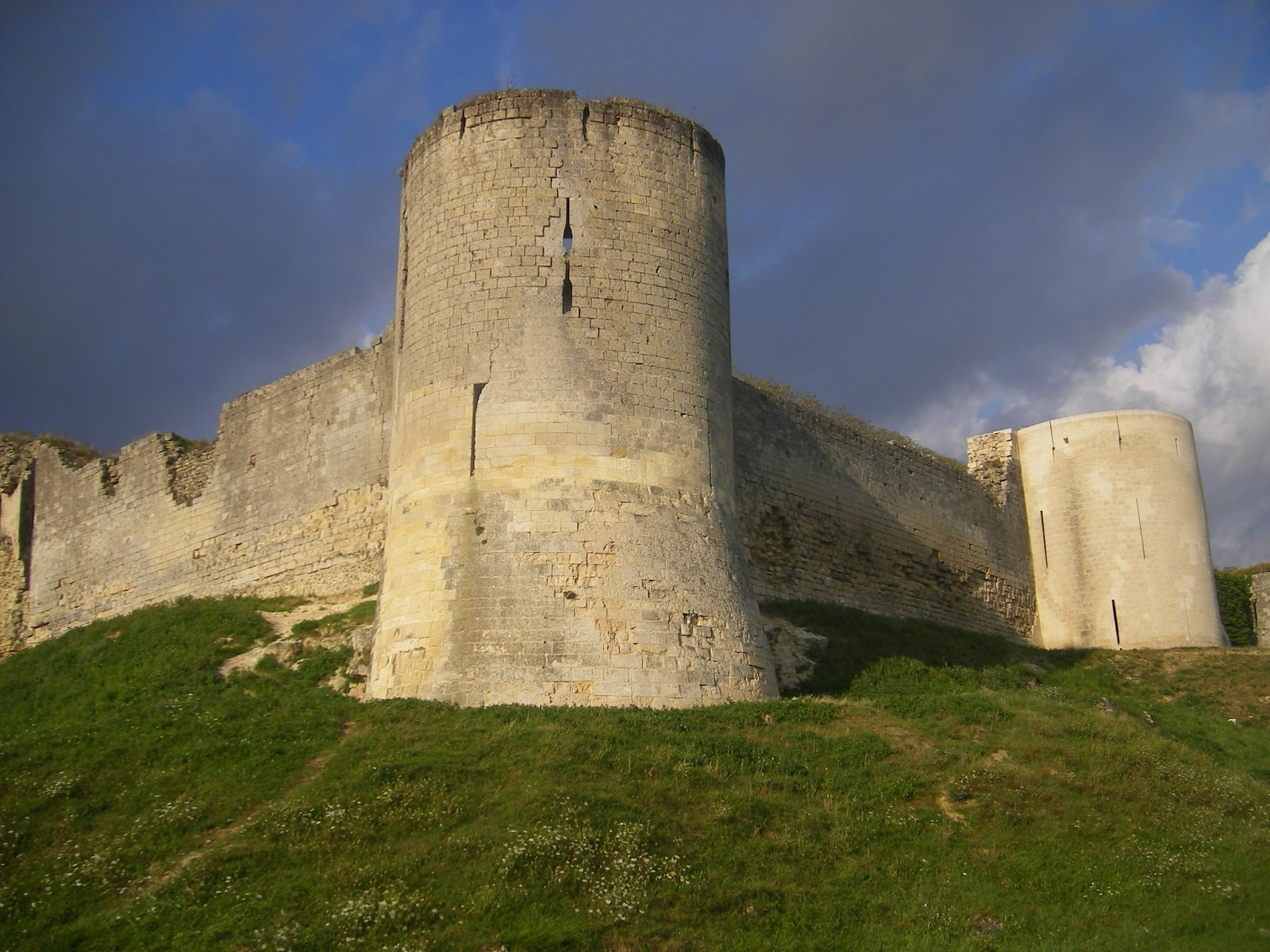
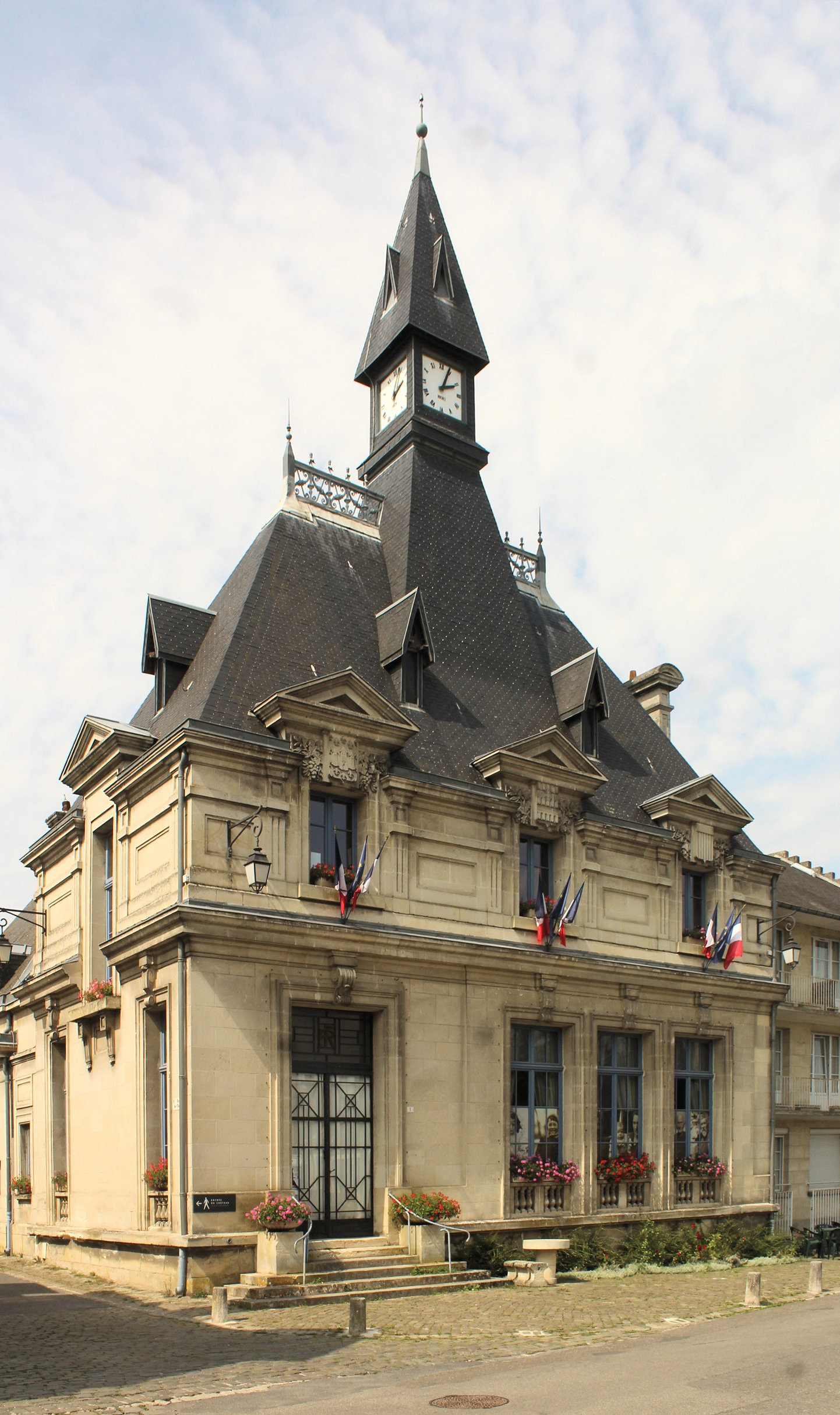
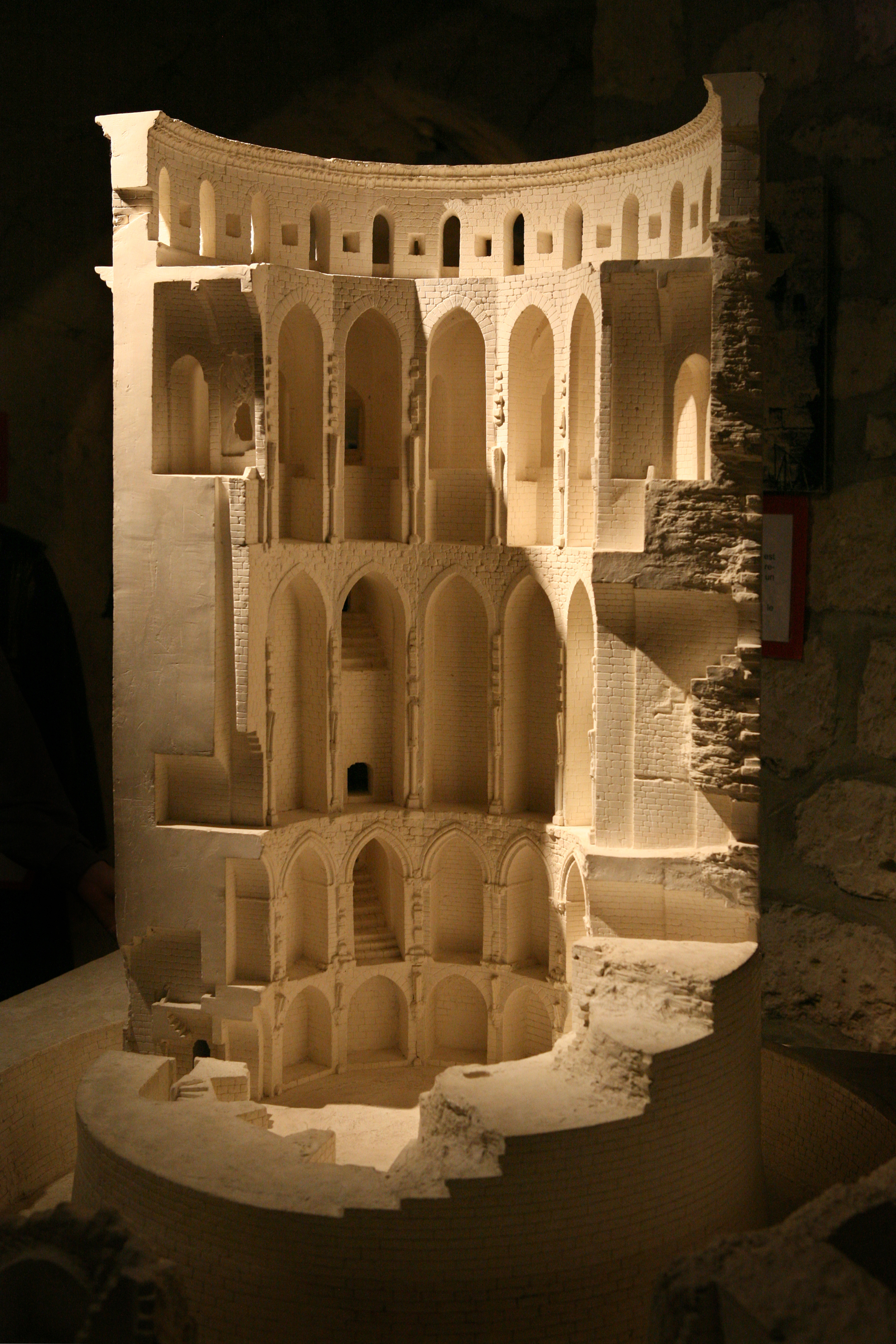
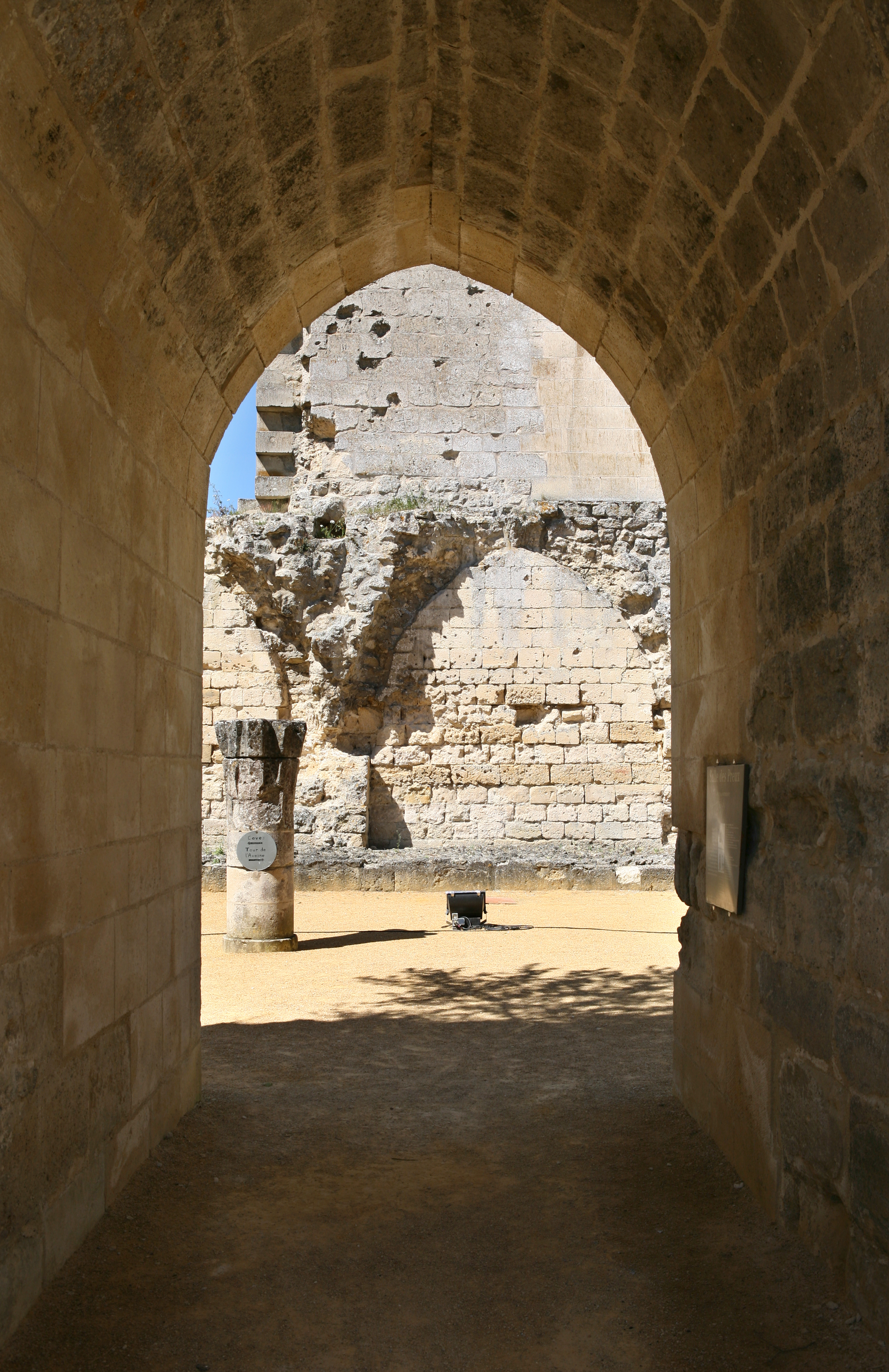
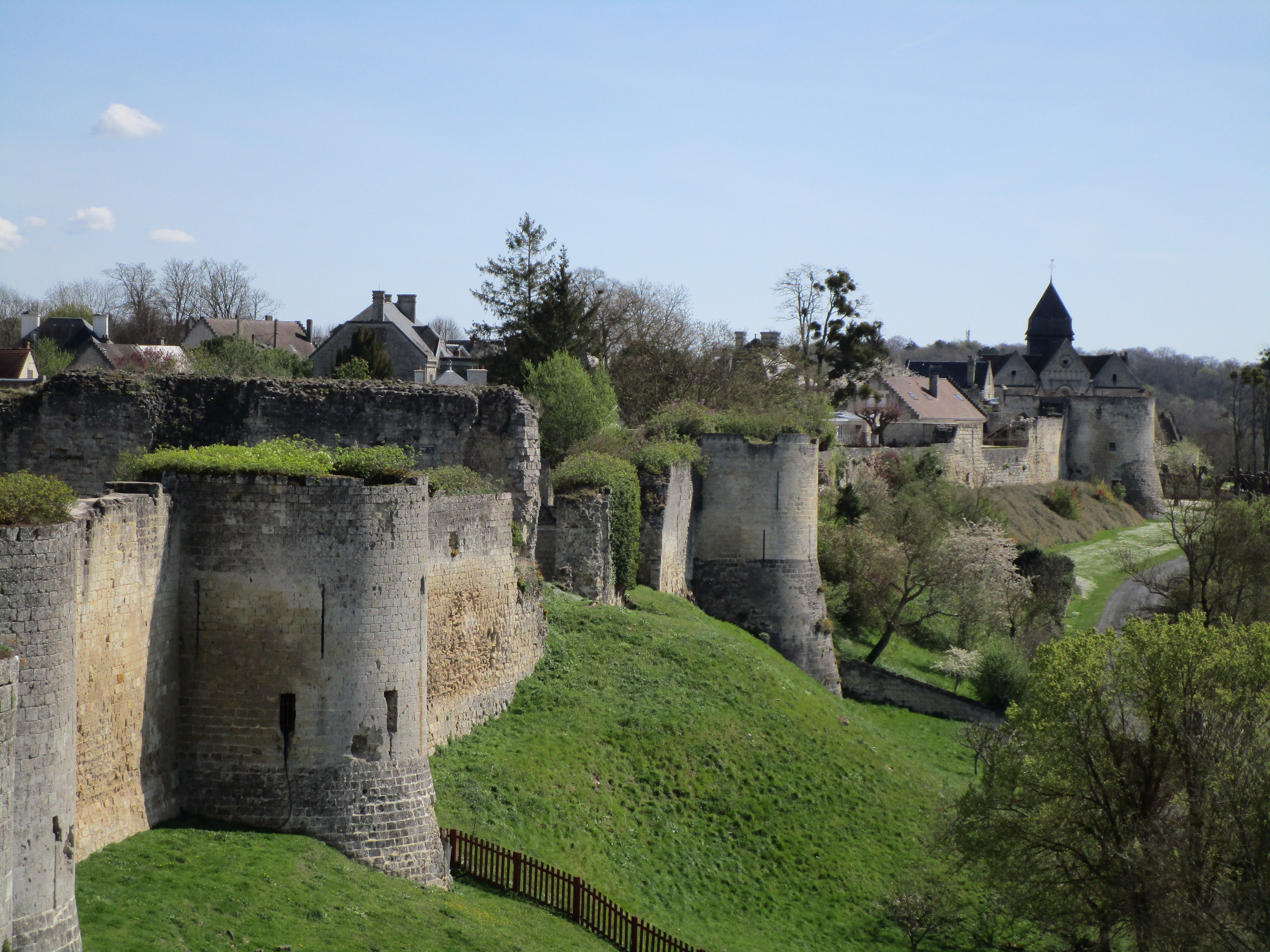
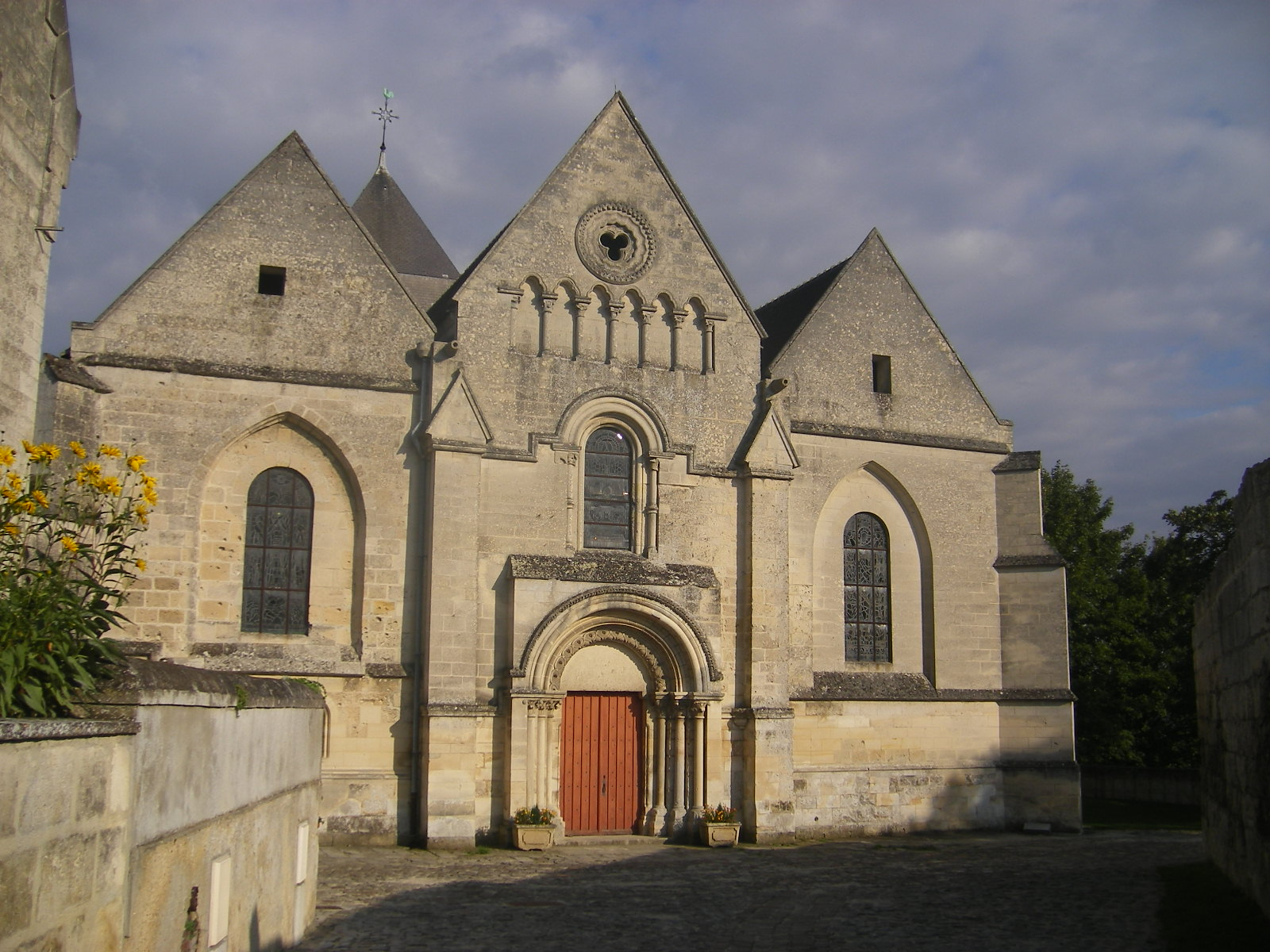
- Ramparts

- Coat of arms
- Location of Coucy-le-Château-Auffrique
- Location within France Location within Hauts-de-France
- Coordinates: 49°31′13″N 3°19′21″E
- Country: France
- Region: Hauts-de-France
- Department: Aisne
- Arrondissement: Laon
- Canton: Vic-sur-Aisne

Government
  - Mayor (2026–32): Sophie Boutroy
- Area^{1}: 11.46 km^{2} (4.42 sq mi)
- Elevation: 112 m (367 ft)
- Highest elevation: 147 m (482 ft)
- Lowest elevation: 47 m (154 ft)
- Population (2023): 990
  - Density: 86/km^{2} (220/sq mi)
- Time zone: UTC+01:00 (CET)
  - Summer (DST): UTC+02:00 (CEST)
- INSEE/Postal code: 02217 /02380
- ^{1} French Land Register data, which excludes lakes, ponds, glaciers > 1 km^{2} (0.386 sq mi or 247 acres) and river estuaries.

Coucy-le-Château-Auffrique (French pronunciation: [kusi l(ə) ʃɑto ofʁik]; Picard: Couchi-Catieu-Aufrike) is a commune in the Aisne department in Hauts-de-France in northern France.

== Geography ==
Coucy is located west of Laon on the road between Tergnier (north) and Soissons (south) north-northeast of Paris.

The river Ailette forms most of the commune's southern border.

== History ==
During the Middle Ages, the town was part of the Barony of Coucy.

== Population ==
Historical population
Year	Pop.	±% p.a.
1968	1,137	—
1975	1,118	−0.24%
1982	1,120	+0.03%
1990	1,058	−0.71%
1999	995	−0.68%
2007	1,046	+0.63%
2012	1,058	+0.23%
2017	1,014	−0.85%
2023	990	−0.40%
Source: INSEE

== Personalities ==
- Moses ben Jacob of Coucy
- Samson of Coucy
- Louis-Xavier Gargan
- César de Vendôme, (born 7 June 1594)
- Ferdinand Stanislas Bigot (6 May 1809 – 1890), mayor of Coucy-le-Château in the 1870s
- François Pipelet de Leury, (1722–1809), director of the Royal Academic Surgery, doctor of the royal family, mayor of Coucy-le-Château for thirty years. Lieutenant of the first surgeon for the king.
- Enguerrand VII de Coucy
- Barbin Pierre Philibert (1819-1868) born in Coucy-le-Chateau, grandfather of the actor Rudolph Valentino.

== Points of interests ==
- Ruins of the Château de Coucy. The modern town is squeezed into the space within the medieval walls.
- A medieval garden
- Domaine de la Grangère (a green space for the garden of the governor's house at the time) - landmark classified in 1931
- A church - rebuilt after World War I.
- The forest nearby Coucy is the place where the Paris Gun was located and first used in WWI.

== See also ==
- Communes of the Aisne department
- List of medieval bridges in France
