= Jeanne of Bar, Countess of Marle and Soissons =

French countess (1415–1462)

Jeanne de Bar
- suo jure Countess of Marle and Soissons suo jure Dame d'Oisy suo jure Viscountess of Meaux; Countess of Saint-Pol, of Brienne, de Ligny, and Conversano
- Born: 1415; France
- Died: 14 May 1462 (aged 46–47); France
- Noble family: House of Montbéliard
- Spouse: Louis of Luxembourg, Count of Saint-Pol, of Brienne, of Ligny, and Conversano
- Issue: John of Luxembourg, Count of Marle and Soissons; Jacqueline of Luxembourg; Pierre II de Luxembourg, Count of Saint-Pol, of Brienne, de Ligny, Marle and Soissons; Helene of Luxembourg; Charles of Luxembourg, Bishop of Laon; Anthony I, Count of Ligny, Brienne and Roussy; Philippe of Luxembourg
- Father: Robert of Bar, Count of Marle and Soissons, Sire d'Oisy (1390 – 25 October 1415 at the Battle of Agincourt)
- Mother: Jeanne de Béthune, Viscountess of Meaux (died late 1450)

Jeanne de Bar, suo jure Countess of Marle and Soissons, Dame d'Oisy, Viscountess of Meaux, and Countess of Saint-Pol, of Brienne, de Ligny, and Conversano (1415 – 14 May 1462) was a noble French heiress and Sovereign Countess. She was the only child of Robert of Bar, Count of Marle and Soissons, Sire d'Oisy, who was killed at the Battle of Agincourt when she was a baby, leaving her the heiress to all his titles and estates. In 1430, at the age of fifteen, Jeanne was one of the three women placed in charge of Joan of Arc when the latter was a prisoner in the castle of John II of Luxembourg, Count of Ligny, Jeanne's stepfather.

She was the first wife of Louis of Luxembourg, Count of Saint-Pol, of Brienne, de Ligny, and Conversano, Constable of France.

== Family ==
Jeanne was born in 1415, the only child of Robert of Bar, Count of Marle and Soissons, Sire d'Oisy (1390- 25 October 1415), whose own mother was Marie de Coucy, Countess of Soissons, granddaughter of English King Edward III of England. Her mother was Jeanne de Béthune, Viscountess of Meaux (c.1397- late 1450).

On 25 October 1415, her father was killed in the Battle of Agincourt, leaving Jeanne, who was a baby, as sole heiress to her father's titles and estates. In 1418, her mother married secondly John II of Luxembourg, Count of Ligny and de Guise (1392 – 5 January 1441), son of John of Luxembourg, Sire de Beauvois and Marguerite of Enghien, Countess of Brienne and of Conversano. The marriage was childless.

It was Jeanne's stepfather John who received Joan of Arc as his prisoner, and kept her at his castle of Beaurevoir. Joan, who was three years Jeanne's senior, was placed in the care of Jeanne, her mother and Jeanne of Luxembourg, John's elderly aunt. The three ladies did all they could to comfort Joan in her captivity, and unsuccessfully tried to persuade her to abandon her masculine clothing for feminine attire. They earned Joan's gratitude for their kind and compassionate treatment of her. Despite the pleas of Jeanne and the other two women, John sold Joan of Arc to the English, who were his allies, for 10,000 livres.

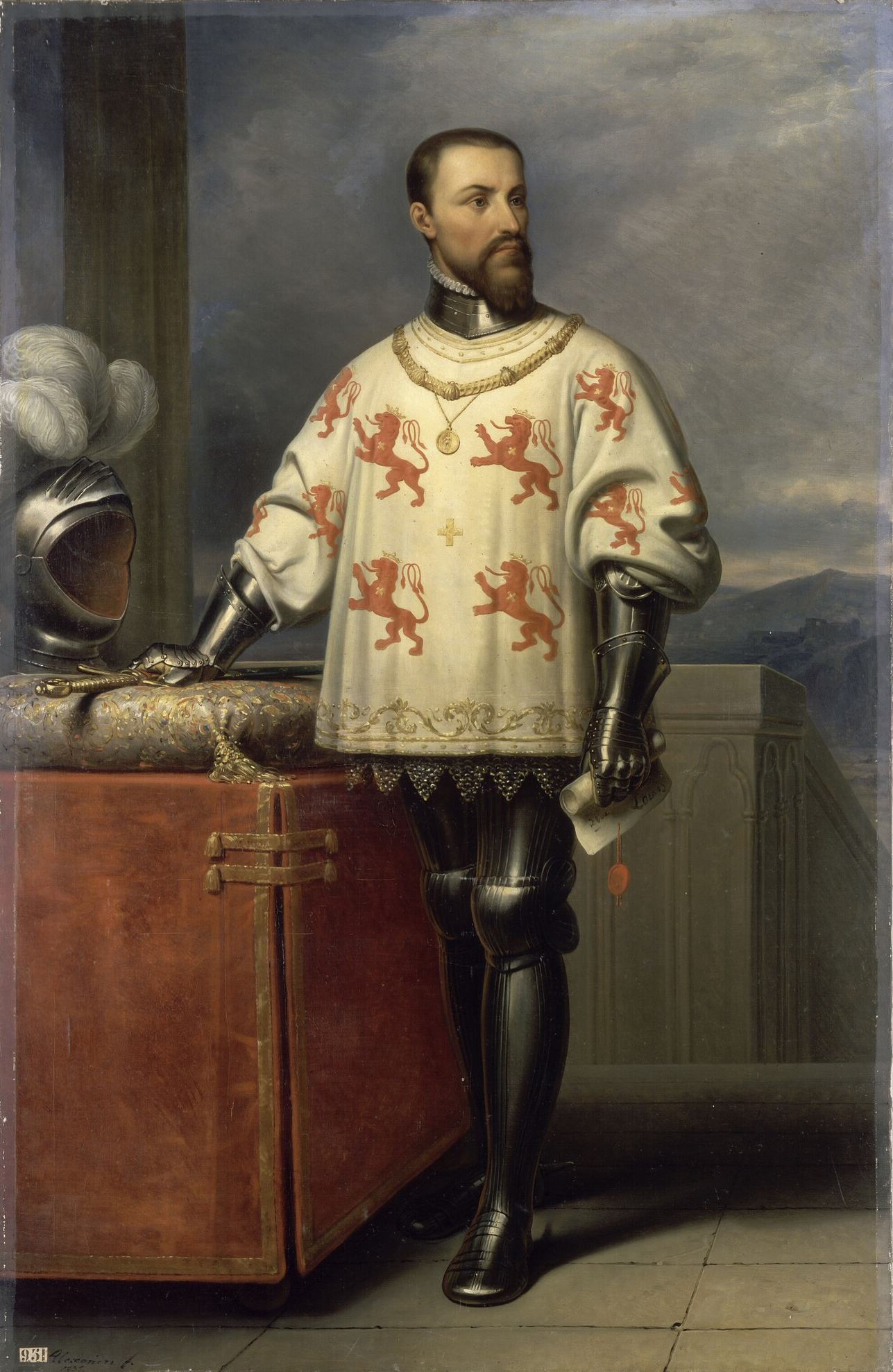
Louis of Luxembourg, Count of Saint-Pol, of Brienne, de Ligny, and Conversano, Constable of France, was the husband of Jeanne de Bar

== Marriage and issue ==
On 16 July 1435, at the age of twenty, Jeanne married Louis of Luxembourg, Count of Saint-Pol, Brienne, de Ligny, and Conversano, Constable of France (1418 – 19 December 1475). The marriage took place at the Chateau de Bohain. She was Louis' first wife. Louis was the eldest son of Peter of Luxembourg, Count of Saint-Pol, Brienne, and Conversano, by his wife Margaret de Baux. Louis had been brought up by his paternal uncle, who was Jeanne's stepfather, John II of Luxembourg, Count of Ligny and Guise; therefore the young couple were well-acquainted with one another. John designated Louis as his heir to the counties of Ligny and Guise, but upon John's death in 1441, King Charles VII of France sequestered the estates and titles. The title of Ligny was eventually restored to Louis. The title and estates of Guise were given to Louis' youngest sister, Isabelle as her dowry, which passed to her husband, Charles, Count of Maine, upon their marriage in 1443.

Jeanne succeeded as Viscountess of Meaux suo jure upon the death of her mother in late 1450.

Jeanne and Louis had seven children:

- John of Luxembourg, Count of Marle and Soissons, Governor of Burgundy (killed at the Battle of Morat on 22 June 1476)
- Jacqueline of Luxembourg (died 1511), married Philippe de Croy, 2nd Count of Porcien, by whom she had issue.
- Pierre II de Luxembourg, Count of Saint-Pol, of Brienne, de Ligny, Marle and Soissons (1448 – 25 October 1482), on 12 July 1466, married Marguerite of Savoy (1439 Turin – 9 March 1483 Bruges), the daughter of Louis, Duke of Savoy and Anne de Lusignan of Cyprus, and widow of Giovanni IV Paleologo, Margrave of Montferrat, by whom he had issue, including Marie de Luxembourg (c. April 1467 – 1 April 1547), wife of François de Bourbon, Count of Vendôme, and from whom Mary, Queen of Scots, King Henry IV of France, the subsequent Bourbon kings of France, and the Lorraine Dukes of Guise were directly descended.
- Helene of Luxembourg (died 23 August 1488), married Janus of Savoy, Count of Faucigny, Governor of Nice (1440–1491), the brother of her sister-in-law, Marguerite of Savoy, by whom she had a daughter, Louise of Savoy (1467 – 1 May 1530).
- Charles of Luxembourg, Bishop of Laon (1447 – 24 November 1509), had several illegitimate children by an unknown mistress.
- Anthony I, Count of Ligny, Brienne, and Roussy (died 1519), married firstly Antoinette de Bauffrémont, Countess de Charny, by whom he had issue; he married secondly, Françoise de Croÿ-Chimay, by whom he had issue; he married thirdly Gillette de Coélivy. His last marriage was childless. By his mistress, Peronne de Machefert, he had an illegitimate son, Antoine of Luxembourg, Bastard of Brienne, who married and left descendants.
- Philippe of Luxembourg (died 1521), Abbesse at Moncel

== Death ==
Jeanne died on 14 May 1462 aged about forty-seven years. Her husband, Louis, was imprisoned in the Bastille and afterward beheaded in Paris on 19 December 1475 for treason against King Louis XI of France.

== Ancestry ==
Ancestors of Jeanne of Bar, Countess of Marle and Soissons

Henry IV of Bar
Robert I of Bar
Yolande of Flanders
Henry of Bar, Marquis Pont-à-Mousson
John II of France
Marie of France
Bonne of Bohemia
Robert of Bar, Count of Marle and Soissons
Enguerrand VI, Lord of Coucy
Enguerrand VII de Coucy
Catherine of Austria
Marie de Coucy, Countess of Soissons
Edward III of England
Isabella of England
Philippa of Hainault
Jeanne de Bar
Guillaume VI de Béthune, Seigneur de Locres
Jean I de Béthune, Seigneur de Locres
Marie de Roye
Robert VIII de Béthune, Viscount of Meaux
Enguerrand de Coucy, Viscount of Meaux
Jeanne de Coucy
Marie de Vienne
Jeanne de Béthune, Viscountess of Meaux
Jean VI de Ghistelles
Jean VII de Ghistelles
Isabelle de Rodes
Isabelle de Ghistelles
N de Reingleset
Marguerite de Reingleset

== Sources ==
- Gregory, Philippa; Baldwin, David; Jones, Michael (2011). The Women of the Cousins' War: The Duchess, the Queen, and the King's Mother. Simon & Schuster Inc.
- Souchal, Geneviève (1974). Masterpieces of Tapestry from the Fourteenth to the Sixteenth Century. Translated by Oxby, Richard A.H. Metropolitan Museum of Art.
- Sullivan, Karen (1999). The Interrogation of Joan of Arc. University of Minnesota Press. ISBN 9780816632688.
