= Jeanne de Béthune, Viscountess of Meaux =

French noblewoman (died 1450)

Jeanne de Béthune
- suo jure Viscountess of Meaux; Countess of Marle and Soissons; Lady of Oisy; Countess of Ligny
- Born: c.1397 France
- Died: Late 1450
- Noble family: House of Béthune
- Spouses: Robert of Bar, Count of Marle and Soissons, Lord of Oisy; John II of Luxembourg, Count of Ligny
- Issue: Jeanne de Bar, Countess of Marle and Soissons
- Father: Robert VIII de Béthune, Viscount of Meaux
- Mother: Isabelle de Ghistelles

Jeanne de Béthune, Viscountess of Meaux, Countess of Ligny (c. 1397- late 1450), was a French noblewoman, the suo jure Viscountess of Meaux, having inherited the title upon her father's death in 1408. Her father was Robert VIII de Béthune, Viscount of Meaux. Jeanne married twice; firstly to Robert of Bar, and secondly John II of Luxembourg, Count of Ligny who held Joan of Arc prisoner following her capture by the Burgundians in May 1430. Jeanne was one of the three women who cared for Joan during her imprisonment.

== Family ==
Jeanne was born in about 1397, the eldest daughter of Robert VIII de Béthune, Viscount of Meaux, and his third wife Isabelle de Ghistelles. She had one younger sister, Jacqueline de Béthune who married Raoul d'Ailly, with whom she had a daughter. Her paternal grandparents were Jean de Béthune, Lord of Locres (Loker in Flemish), and his wife Jeanne de Coucy, while her maternal grandparents were Jean de Ghistelles (Gistel in Flemish) and Marguerite de Reingleset (Reigersvliet in Flemish).

After campaigning successfully against the English as Lieutenant-Governor of Guienne, in February 1408 her father died. As he had no male heirs, Jeanne, being his eldest daughter, succeeded to the title as suo jure Viscountess of Meaux. She was about eleven years of age.

== Marriages and issue ==
On 16 February 1409, Jeanne married her first husband, Robert of Bar, the son Henry of Bar and Marie de Coucy, Countess of Soissons. In August 1413, he was created Count of Marle and Soissons, and Lord of Oisy, titles which he had inherited from his mother. King John II of France and King Edward III of England were two of his great-grandfathers. Together Robert and Jeanne had one daughter:

- Jeanne de Bar, Countess of Marle and Soissons, Lady of Oisy, Viscountess of Meaux suo jure (1415 – 14 May 1462), married Louis de Luxembourg, Count of Saint-Pol, of Brienne, of Ligny, and Conversano, by whom she had seven children.

Robert was one of the many French nobles killed at the Battle of Agincourt on 25 October 1415, leaving Jeanne a widow of eighteen with an infant daughter who as sole heiress succeeded to her father's titles and estates. Jeanne married secondly on 23 November 1418, John II of Luxembourg, Count of Ligny. The marriage, however, did not produce any children.

== Joan of Arc ==
Jeanne's second husband, who was an ally of the English during the last phase of the Hundred Years War, received Joan of Arc as his prisoner following her capture by the Burgundians in May 1430. She was held in his castle of Beaurevoir, close to Saint-Quentin. Jeanne was one of the three women in whose custody Joan was placed. The other two ladies were Jeanne's daughter, Jeanne, and Jeanne of Luxembourg, John's elderly aunt. Jeanne and the other ladies did all they could to comfort Joan, and they also tried to persuade her, to no avail, to discard her masculine clothing and adopt feminine attire. The ladies earned Joan's gratitude for their kindness to her whilst in their care. In the 1994 film by Jacques Rivette "Jeanne la pucelle: 2. Les prisons" (in English Joan the Maiden, Part 2: The Prisons), Jeanne was played by Édith Scob.

Due to pressure from England and Burgundy, John sold Joan to the English for 10,000 livres despite the protests of the three women. Joan was tried by an ecclesiastical court and burned at the stake in Rouen on 30 May 1431.

== Legacy and death ==
On 18 September 1430, John's aunt, Jeanne of Luxembourg died. She left him the county of Ligny, thus Jeanne was styled henceforth as Countess of Ligny.

Jeanne married her only daughter to Louis of Luxembourg, Count of Saint-Pol, who was John's nephew and designated heir; he had been brought up under his uncle's provision at Beaurevoir Castle therefore the young couple were well-acquainted with one another. The marriage, which took place on 16 July 1435, produced seven children.

Widowed a second time in 1441 when aged about 44, it was proposed that Jeanne should marry Jean d'Orléans, Count of Angoulême and of Périgord, a prisoner in England since 1412. When he did get back to France after 33 years' captivity, he married a younger woman who gave him three children.

Jeanne de Béthune died in late 1450, almost ten years after her husband, John. Her daughter Jeanne succeeded her as suo jure Viscountess of Meaux.
