= Enguerrand VII de Coucy =

14th-century French nobleman

Enguerrand VII
- Lord of Coucy
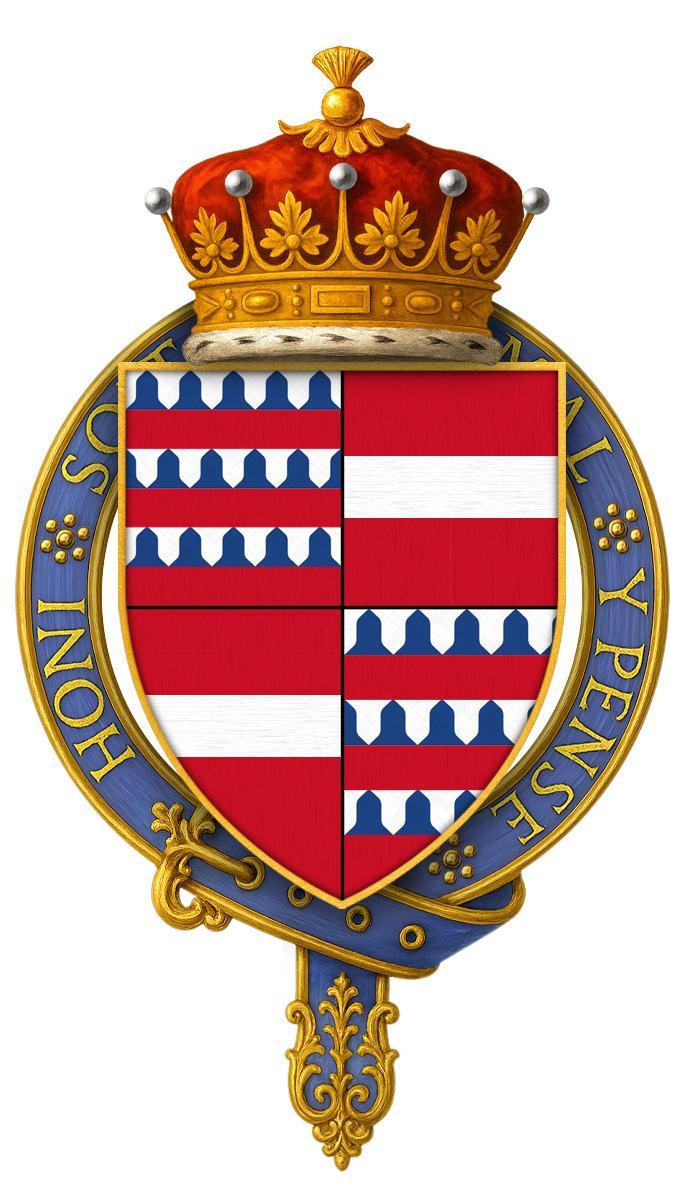
- Arms of Enguerrand VII, Lord of Coucy, KG
- Born: Enguerrand de Coucy; 1340; Coucy Castle, Picardy, France
- Died: 18 February 1397 (aged 56–57); Bursa, Ottoman Empire; In captivity, of bubonic plague
- Spouses: Isabella of England; Isabelle of Lorraine
- Issue: Marie de Coucy, Countess of Soissons; Philippa de Coucy, Countess of Oxford; Isabelle de Coucy, Countess of Nevers; Perceval (illegitimate son)
- Father: Enguerrand VI, Lord of Coucy
- Mother: Catherine of Austria
- Title held: 25 August 1346 – 18 February 1397
- Other titles: Earl of Bedford; Count of Soissons
- Locality: Coucy-le-Château-Auffrique

Enguerrand VII de Coucy, KG (1340 – 18 February 1397), also known as Ingelram de Coucy and Ingelram de Couci, was a medieval French nobleman and the last Lord of Coucy. He became a son-in-law of King Edward III of England following his marriage to the king's daughter, Isabella of England, and the couple was subsequently granted several English estates, among them the title Earl of Bedford. Coucy fought in the Battle of Nicopolis in 1396 as part of a failed crusade against the Ottoman Empire, but was taken prisoner and contracted the bubonic plague. He died in captivity the following year at Bursa.

Coucy had no surviving legitimate sons. Fierce legal disputes were fought over the succession of his lordship of Coucy, which, as a result, passed to the crown lands of France.

== Early years ==
Enguerrand VII became Lord of Coucy at the death of his father Enguerrand VI, during the campaign culminating in the Battle of Crécy in 1346. He also gained the titles of 4th Lord Gynes, Sire d' Oisy, in the district of Marle, and the Sire de La Fère. His mother, Catherine of Austria, oldest daughter of Leopold I, Duke of Austria, had died in 1349, during a wave of the Black Death. Coucy first became involved in the war against England at the age of fifteen, serving among the barons of Picardy in the battalion of Moreau de Fiennes. In 1358, at the age of eighteen, Coucy helped lead the suppression of the peasant revolt known as the Jacquerie.

== Between England and France ==
Young Coucy first met King Edward III of England in 1359, as one of forty royal and noble hostages exchanged for the future release of the captured King John II of France. He was retained as a hostage in 1360, when the Treaty of Brétigny established territorial adjustments between the two countries, and set the monetary payments for King John's release. The hostages finally arrived in England in November 1360. Coucy was to spend the next five years as a guest of the Royal Court. Chronicler Jean Froissart records that, "the young lord de Coucy shined in dancing and caroling whenever it was his turn. He was in great favour with both the French and English..."

In 1365, the wealthy Coucy was betrothed and married to the 33-year-old Isabella of England, who has been described as an over-indulged, willful, and wildly extravagant princess. To care for her personal needs, her father settled a substantial annual income on her for life, as well as gifts of costly jewellery, and properties that included manors, castles, and priories. Coucy was her choice as a husband, as she wished to marry for love after the failure of previous betrothal negotiations with several noble houses of Europe. Coucy received, as part of the marriage settlement, the restoration of former Coucy lands in Yorkshire, Lancaster, Westmorland, and Cumberland, England. He was also released as a hostage for the French treaty requirements, with no payment of ransom. In November 1365, after their marriage on 27 July, the couple was given leave to travel to France. Their daughter, Marie de Coucy, was born in April 1366 at Coucy in Picardy, France. During a subsequent visit to England with his new family, Coucy was created as Earl of Bedford, and was inducted into the Order of the Garter. In 1367, Coucy's second daughter, Philippa de Coucy, was born in England. At this time, Coucy was presented with additional French lands, receiving the title Count of Soissons, which had come to King Edward III through the payment of ransom.

Coucy and his English wife spent much of their lives on their northern French estate, although Isabella made frequent trips to England, particularly while Coucy was away in the service of France. He held the office of Governor of Brittany in 1380. He also held the offices of Grand Butler of France and Marshal of France. Considered among the most skilled and experienced of all the knights of France, Coucy twice refused the position of Constable of France, the kingdom's highest and most lucrative military office.

Always diplomatic, Coucy managed to maintain both his allegiance to the King of France and to his English father-in-law during the period of intermittent armed conflict between England and France known as the Hundred Years' War. At various times, he acted as a captain, envoy, councillor and mediator during the conflict. However, Coucy resigned all of his English honours on the accession of King Richard II on 26 August 1377.

== French Sire ==
In the autumn of 1375 Coucy engaged a number of Free Companies, including one led by Owain Lawgoch, to seize some Habsburg lands which he claimed through his mother. However, in the resulting Gugler War Coucy's troops were attacked when passing through Switzerland, and after a number of reverses, the expedition had to be abandoned.

In 1379, after the death of Isabella of England, Coucy married Isabelle in 1386, daughter of John I, Duke of Lorraine and Sophie von Württemberg; they had one daughter, Isabel de Coucy (date of birth unknown; died 1411). The 1390 Barbary Crusade saw Coucy as a participant.

Coucy died at age 56, on 18 February 1397, at Bursa, Ottoman Empire after participating in the last medieval crusade against the Ottoman army of Bayezid I and his allies. The crusade climaxed with the calamitous Battle of Nicopolis on 28 September 1396, one of the most crushing military defeats in medieval European history. After a successful initial engagement against part of the Ottoman force, Coucy and other senior knights recommended a pause to regroup, but they were overruled by the impetuous younger knights, who wrongly believed they had just defeated the main force of Bayezid's army. Eager for glory, these knights then led their forces in a reckless pursuit of the fleeing Turks, only to run up against a fresh corps of Turkish sipahis that Bayezid had kept in reserve. A desperate battle ensued, but at the height of the fighting Bayezid's Serbian ally arrived with reinforcements, turning the tide in the Turks' favour. The Christian forces were utterly routed, thousands of Crusader soldiers were killed on the field, and nearly all the knights commanding the Crusader army, including Coucy, were either dead or captured.

Coucy and many other leading nobles were taken prisoner, and the next day Bayezid forced the knights to watch the day-long mass beheading of hundreds (and possibly as many as 3000) Crusader soldiers who had been captured by the Turks. The prisoners were then stripped of most of their clothing and in most cases even their shoes, and force-marched 350 km to Gallipoli. During the march, Coucy reportedly came close to death from exposure but was saved by another captive, who gave him his coat. From Gallipoli the prisoners were then transported to Bursa and held prisoner, awaiting the payment of ransoms. Although strenuous efforts were made in France over the next few months to arrange the release of the captives, Coucy died before his bounty could be paid, due to an outbreak of the bubonic plague among the Turks, although it is likely that he had already been greatly weakened by the wounds he suffered at Nicopolis, and the hardships of the subsequent forced march. His body was returned to Europe and he was buried at the Abbey of Villeneuve, near Soissons, France.

== Family ==
Coucy married as his first wife, Isabella of England, and had two children by her:

- Marie de Coucy, Countess of Soissons (1366–1405), married Henry of Bar, Marquis de Pont-à-Mousson and Lord of Marle.
- Philippa de Coucy (1367–1411), married Robert de Vere, 9th Earl of Oxford.

Coucy married as his second wife, Isabelle of Lorraine, daughter of John I, Duke of Lorraine and Sophie of Württemberg, and had one child by her:

- Isabelle de Coucy (1386–1411), married Philip II, Count of Nevers

== Coucy's campaigns ==
Enguerrand participated in the following campaigns:

- 1358 Suppression of the Jacquerie
- 1369 Alsace campaign
- 1372-3 Papal Visconti campaign
- 1375 Gugler war
- 1378 Normandy campaign, Hundred Years War (HYW)
- 1379 Defense of the Picardy, (HYW)
- 1382 Suppression of Flemish uprising
- 1384 Italian campaign
- 1386 Preparation for invasion of England, (HYW)
- 1388 Guelders campaign
- 1390 Barbary Crusade
- 1395 Campaign against Genoa
- 1396 Battle of Nicopolis

== Coucy estate ==
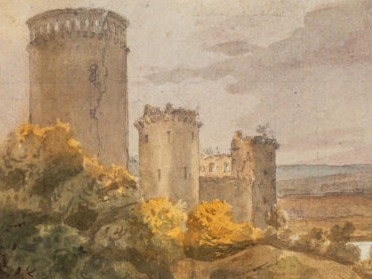
Chateau of Coucy showing donjon tower, watercolor, ca 1820 (Bibliothèque Nationale, Paris)

Coucy inherited the most awesome fortress in Europe at the death of his father, Enguerrand VI in 1346. The castle is known as the Château de Coucy and is considered a spectacular architectural achievement for its time. Coucy was responsible for the maintenance of the castle and additional construction on his familial estates, which consisted of the fortress, 150 towns and villages, famous forests and ponds, along with significant revenue. The estate was centred in the commune of Coucy Le Château Auffrique, in the modern Department of Aisne, France.

Coucy found his estate in difficult economic and social circumstances when he returned from England in 1366. During his absence, facilities and agricultural properties in the estate communities had been damaged by both armies engaged in the war. Mills, granaries, breweries and other structures had to be rebuilt. Hired labour was in short supply, due both to the Black Death and war casualties. In addition, serfs permanently attached to the estate had fled to outlying communities, seeking work and security. In August 1368, Coucy issued a collective grant of freedom to 22 towns and villages under his control. He noted in the charter that his late father had intended to grant his subjects their freedom, but that the action was prevented by his premature death. Coucy established a system of rents and revenues intended to return the estate to prosperity and attract workers.

After the death of Coucy, his former squire and first cousin Aubert, an illegitimate son of his father's brother, was legitimized by Charles VI. Aubert de Coucy, however, was not involved in a prolonged dispute over the Coucy estate between Coucy's eldest daughter, Marie de Bar, and his second wife, Isabelle of Lorraine (d. 1423). Upon Marie's sudden death in 1405, the vast Coucy lands became part of the royal estates of France.

The famous castle was renovated by Eugène Viollet-le-Duc in the 19th century. However, in 1917 it was deliberately blown up with 28 tons of explosives at the order of German General Erich Ludendorff. This apparently was done for no other reason than to spite Prince Rupprecht of Bavaria who had asked Ludendorff to protect the castle from war damage.

== In later culture ==
The courtship of Coucy and his first wife comprises a large portion of the plot of The Lady Royal, a novel by Molly Costain Haycraft. A fictionalized account of the life of Princess Isabella of England, it paints an extremely romantic portrait of the couple. Coucy and his first wife Isabella of England are supporting characters in the historical fiction novel The First Princess of Wales, by Karen Harper. Coucy's life is the central theme to Barbara Tuchman's 1978 history A Distant Mirror: The Calamitous 14th century.

== Sources ==
- Bradbury, Jim (2004). Medieval Warfare. Routledge.
- Cokayne, George Edward (1926). The Complete Peerage of England, Scotland, Ireland, Great Britain. Vol. 6. St. Catherine Press, Limited.
- Glendinning, Miles (2013). The Conservation Movement: A History of Architectural Preservation, Antiquity to Modernity. Routledge.
- Lutkin, Jessica (2010). "Isabella de Coucy, daughter of Edward III: The Exception Who Proves the Rule". In Given-Wilson, Chris; Saul, Nigel (eds.). Fourteenth Century England VI. The Boydell Press.

Preceded by Enguerrand VI	Lord of Coucy; 1340–1397	Extinct
