= Cultural depictions of Edward III of England =

Edward III of England has been depicted in a number of fictional works.

== Literature ==
Edward III of England is the central character in the late 16th century play Edward III. This play was published anonymously but since the 1990s, a growing consensus among experts has emerged that it was at least partially written by William Shakespeare during his early career. Many passages have lines that are used in other works of Shakespeare's, such as "lilies that fester smell far worse than weeds" which is also found in Sonnet 94 and "scarlet ornaments" from Sonnet 142. Although the language is not as fluid as in some of Shakespeare's more famous and later history plays such as Richard II, textual analysis has found similarities between Edward III and Shakespeare's other early history plays King John and Henry VI. Shakespeare expert Gary Taylor wrote in 2005 that "of all the non-canonical plays, Edward III has the strongest claim to inclusion in the Complete Works". Edward III is now regularly included in collections of Shakespeare's works after Yale University Press first did so in 1996.

He also appears as a boy in Edward II by Christopher Marlowe. Edward is also the protagonist of William Blake's early drama Edward the Third, part of his Poetical Sketches, published in 1783. George Bernard Shaw portrayed Edward for dramatic purposes as, in Shaw's preface to The Six of Calais, behaving himself like an unrestrained human being in a very trying situation. He also appears in Gaetano Donizetti's opera L'assedio di Calais. Edward III appeared in George Alfred Lawrence's "sensation novel" about the Hundred Years' War, Brakespeare (1868). The novella "The Countess Alys" (in The New Canterbury Tales (1901)) by Maurice Hewlett features Edward III as a character. Edward was also depicted in historical novels for younger readers, including St. George For England (1885) by G. A. Henty. Edward is also featured in his role as English commander during the Battle of Crécy, in the novel Red Eve (1911) by Rider Haggard. Edward features in two British novels for young adults, Ride into Danger (1959) by Henry Treece and Bowman of Crécy (1966) by Ronald Welch.

Edward appears in Maurice Druon's series of historical novels Les Rois maudits (The Accursed Kings). In the 1965 novel The King is a Witch by Evelyn Eaton, Edward is covertly a follower of a pagan "Old Religion".

Edward is a major character in The King's Mistress by Emma Campion and her Owen Archer mystery novel The Lady Chapel (1994) under the name Candace Robb. He appears in the 2000 Bernard Cornwell novel Harlequin, as well as in the 2007 Ken Follett novel World Without End, the sequel to Pillars of the Earth. Edward also appears briefly in The First Princess of Wales by Karen Harper.

Jaehaerys Targaryen from the A Song of Ice and Fire series draws heavily from Edward III for inspiration. The in-universe history textbook Fire & Blood explains his reign at length. Both came to the throne at 14 after the death of their weak fathers, eventually overthrew their mothers' lovers as regent, spent most of their early reigns healing the divisions of internal conflict, were significant modernizers of their kingdoms, saw a great plague kill many of their loved ones and advisors, had about a dozen children, took downturns after the death of their wives, and reigned for so long that they were succeeded by a grandson.

== Screen adaptations ==
Edward III has rarely been portrayed on screen. He was portrayed by Charles Kent in the 1911 silent short The Death of King Edward III and by Michael Hordern in the 1955 film The Dark Avenger, about Edward, the Black Prince. As a boy he has been portrayed by Stéphane Combesco in the 1982 French TV adaptation of Marlowe's play and by Jody Graber in Derek Jarman's 1991 version. In World Without End (2012), Blake Ritson portrayed Edward III.

Jean-Louis Broust portrayed Edward III in the 1972 French TV adaptation of Druon's Les Rois maudits novels, and Aurélien Wiik played the role in the 2005 French TV adaptation. A new English language adaptation of the novels for film is expected to go into production in 2027.

Edward is implied to be the son of Isabella and Scottish patriot William Wallace in the 1995 film Braveheart. This is historically impossible, as, at the time of Wallace's execution in 1305, Isabella was still only ten years old, and this was seven years before Edward was born.

== Video Games ==
Edward III is one of the available playable characters in Crusader Kings II's late Medieval start date.
