= A Distant Mirror =

1978 history book by Barbara Tuchman

- First edition
- Author: Barbara Tuchman
- Language: English
- Subject: Crisis of the Late Middle Ages
- Publisher: Alfred A. Knopf
- Publication date: 1978
- Publication place: United States
- Media type: Print (paperback, hardcover)
- Awards: National Book Award, 1980
- ISBN: 978-0-394-40026-6
- OCLC: 3870107

A Distant Mirror: The Calamitous 14th Century is a narrative history book by the American historian Barbara Tuchman, first published by Alfred A. Knopf in 1978. It won a 1980 U.S. National Book Award in History. (Note: This was the 1980 award for paperback History. From 1980 to 1983, dual hardcover and paperback awards were given in most categories, and in multiple nonfiction subcategories, including History. Most of the paperback award-winners were reprints, including this one.)

The main title, A Distant Mirror, conveys Tuchman's thesis that the death and suffering of the 14th century reflect those of the 20th century, particularly the horrors of World War I and the ominous prospect of nuclear war threatening her time.

== Summary ==
The book's focus is the Crisis of the late Middle Ages which caused widespread suffering in Europe in the 14th century. Drawing heavily on Froissart's Chronicles, Tuchman recounts the histories of the Hundred Years' War, the Black Plague, the Papal Schism, pillaging mercenaries, anti-Semitism, popular revolts including the Jacquerie in France, the liberation of Switzerland, the Battle of the Golden Spurs, and various peasant uprisings. She also discusses the advance of the Islamic Ottoman Empire into Europe until the disastrous Battle of Nicopolis. However, Tuchman's scope is not limited to political and religious events. She begins with a discussion of the Little Ice Age, a change in climate that reduced average temperatures in Europe well into the mid-19th century, and describes the lives of all social classes, including nobility, clergy, and peasantry.

Much of the narrative is woven around the life of the French nobleman Enguerrand de Coucy. Tuchman chose him as a central figure partly because his life spanned much of the 14th century, from 1340 to 1397. A powerful French noble who married Isabella, eldest daughter of Edward III of England, Coucy's ties put him in the middle of events.

== Critical reception ==
A Distant Mirror received much popular acclaim. A reviewer in History Today described it as an enthralling work full of "vivid pen-portraits". In The Spectator, David Benson called it "an exciting and even bracing" book which did away with many sentimental myths about the Middle Ages. It also received a favorable review in the Los Angeles Times.

However, scholarly reaction was lukewarm. In the journal Speculum, Charles T. Wood praised Tuchman's narrative abilities but described the book as a "curiously dated and old-fashioned work" and criticized it for being shaped by the political concerns of the United States in the late 1960s and early 1970s. Bernard S. Bachrach criticized Tuchman's reliance on secondary sources and dated translations of medieval narratives at the expense of archival research, and characterized the book as a whole as "a readable fourteenth-century version of the Fuzz n' Wuz (cops and corpses) that dominates the evening news on television". Thomas Ohlgren agreed with many of Bachrach's criticisms, and further took issue with many perceived anachronisms in Tuchman's characterization of the medieval world and a lack of scholarly rigor. William McNeill, writing in the Chicago Tribune, thought that A Distant Mirror, while well-written on a technical level, did not present an intelligible picture of the period.

David Dunham reviewed A Distant Mirror for Different Worlds magazine and stated that "The information density is fairly high, and it's quite readable. I recommend A Distant Mirror to anyone interested in learning more about the middle ages."

The book inspired Katherine Hoover to write her composition Medieval Suite.

== Editions ==
As of 2023, all editions are re-printings with identical pagination and contents (xx, 677 pages).

- — (August 1978). A Distant Mirror: The Calamitous 14th Century (1st ed.). New York City: Alfred A. Knopf. ISBN 978-0-394-40026-6. OCLC 1004881871.
- — (1979). A Distant Mirror: The Calamitous 14th Century. London: Macmillan. ISBN 978-0-333-19752-3. OCLC 16499028.
- — (September 1979). A Distant Mirror: The Calamitous 14th Century. New York City: Ballantine Books. ISBN 978-0-345-34957-6. OCLC 5521434 – via Internet Archive.
- — (August 3, 2011). A Distant Mirror: The Calamitous 14th Century. New York City: Ballantine Books. ISBN 978-0-307-79369-0 – via Google Books.
- — (October 5, 2017). A Distant Mirror: The Calamitous 14th Century. New York City: Penguin Books. ISBN 978-0-241-97298-4.
