= Château de Condé =

French château

Coordinates: 49°00′20″N 3°33′34″E

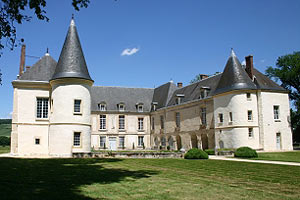
Southern façade of the Château de Condé

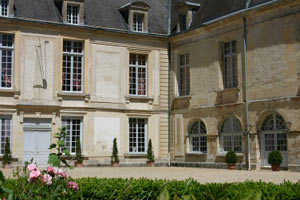
Cour d'honneur (partial)

The Château de Condé is a private estate in Condé-en-Brie, Aisne, France, set in a park on the Champagne route 100 km from Paris.

The Château de Condé is a private estate, listed as a historic monument and inhabited year round. Its 17th and 18th century interiors were created by artists (Watteau, Boucher, Oudry, Servandoni and others) at the behest of the Princes of Savoy and then the Marquis de la Faye. This château evokes part of France's history, through illustrious characters like the Condés, the Savoies, Jean de La Fontaine, Cardinal Richelieu, Mazarin, not forgetting Olympe and her suspect "powders". Highlights include the "Watteau" wing and its recently discovered frescoes, Richelieu's bed chamber, the magnificent "trompe-l'œil" effects of Servandoni, the "little private apartments" and the outstanding drawing room decorated by Oudry.

== History ==
The village of Condé-en-Brie has been inhabited since the time of pre-Roman civilisation. In 500 BC, the Senones fought nearby a battle against the Condrusi. Traces of this presence have been found in the village and in the Château itself, which was probably a Gallo-Roman land estate. As a matter of fact, an ancient pavement of Roman times exist under the present pavement of the Château.

The village derives its name from the confluence of two rivers, the Surmelin and the Dhuys, which merge before feeding the river Marne: Condé derives from the Celtic word condatum, meaning "confluent".

The castle's history during the Middle Ages was closely linked to the Coucy family. The first lord of Condé was Jean de Montmirail, whose son-in-law was Enguerrand III, Lord of Coucy. It was he who constructed, at the end of the 12th century, a "keep", part of which is still to be seen, and which had 2 meters thick walls and towering chimneys.

The last heir of the House of Coucy, Marie I de Coucy, Countess of Soissons, moved into the Château with her husband, Henry of Bar, in the 15th century. Condé was passed down through marriage to the House of Luxembourg, and in 1487, Marie of Luxembourg married Francis de Bourbon, Count of Vendôme. Due to this marriage, the family came into contact with the royal family. Their grandson, Antoine de Bourbon, Duke of Vendôme, was the father of King Henry IV of France, and his brother, Louis de Bourbon, was the first Prince of Condé, who frequently came to the Château de Condé to hunt, as a child.

Cardinal Charles de Bourbon rebuilt the castle in Renaissance style in the 16th century. The two gatehouses are the testimony of this time. The gatehouse on the right was inhabited by the Captain of the Castle; it still contains an underground jail with an exceptional locking system. The one on the left (now a barn) was the house-keeper's lodge. The castle was one of the strongholds of the Prince of Condé, who was chief of the Protestant party during the French Wars of Religion. His wife, Éléonore de Roye, and her children often came here to get away from the troubles.

Up to 1624, the date of the marriage of Marie de Bourbon, Countess of Soissons to Thomas, Prince of Carignan (the present Italian royal family), the castle belonged to the House of Condé. Unfortunately, it was badly damaged, from 1711 to 1719, by troops that were sent by King Louis XIV, who had it confiscated during the Franco-Austrian War (the owner of the time being a cousin of an Austrian general). It was stayed in by the famous Jeanne Baptiste d'Albert, comtesse de Verrue.

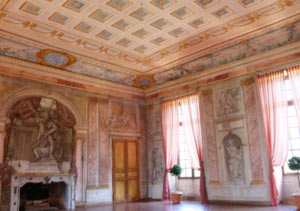
Room decorated by Servandoni.

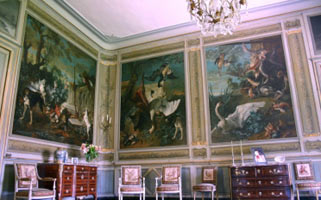
Salon decorated by Jean-Baptiste Oudry (partial)

The confiscated castle was bought in 1719 by a private secretary of King Louis XIV, whose name was Jean-François Leriget, Marquis de la Faye. He was councillor to the King and a diplomat. It was he who was in charge of finding a wife to the young King Louis XV.

The Marquis was a member of the French Academy, a director of the French India Company, and accordingly, was a very rich man. In his mansion in Paris, he often received such famous people as Voltaire and Crébillon.

Much of the castle's final appearance is due to the Marquis' tastes. He brought to Condé, the talents of the Italian architect Servandoni, a master of the "deception" style, and one of the architects of the Palazzo Farnese in Rome. He shut down the southern aisle, to allow the sun to penetrate into the rooms, and gave a symmetrical appearance to the other aisle. To achieve this, he was obliged to paint false windows in the medieval part of the Castle, the walls being 2 meters thick. For the interior decoration, he invited fashionable painters of the time - Lemoyne, his disciple Boucher, Watteau and his disciple Lancret, and last but not least, Jean-Baptiste Oudry.

At a later date, the castle belonged to the Count de la Tour du Pin Lachaux, through his marriage with the niece of the Marquis de la Faye. In 1814, the Countess de Sade, the daughter-in-law of the famous Marquis de Sade, inherited Condé from her cousin, La Tour du Pin. Since this time and up to 1983, the castle remained the property of the Sade family, who restored it with much care after the two World Wars.

== Restoration ==
In 1983, Alain Pasté de Rochefort purchased the chateau which had been for sale for many years. Here he did not feel a stranger since his ancestor Captain Pasté was in the 16th century one of the two captains of the first Prince of Condé's personal guard. He was restless and, with the help of the Administration of Historical Monuments, started a series of works: the roofs were repaired, including those of dependencies such as "La Porterie" and "La Capitainerie" as well as the 17 fireplaces, gutters and stonework. Restoration of the façades could then begin, along with the grand staircase or the small apartments whose woodwork and parquet needed to be partly dismantled. The Watteau wing, which had suffered in both wars, had its colours restored. Each room evokes Watteau and his followers (Lancret and Pater) who painted landscapes, "fêtes galantes", tales by Jean de la Fontaine painted on the walls. While some paintings were hidden (behind wallpaper or mirrors), they were later discovered after many years of restoration.

== Gallery ==
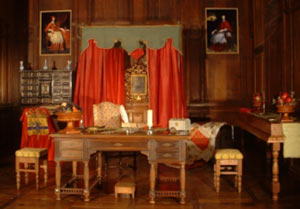
Bedroom of Cardinal de Richelieu

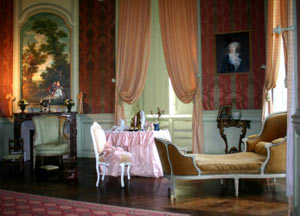
Bedroom of Olympe

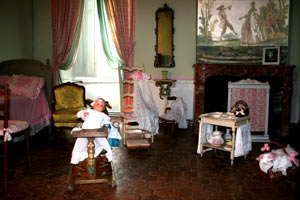
Bedroom of the Musician (detail of the Watteau wing)

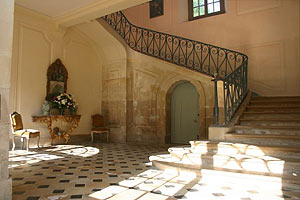
Escalier d'honneur

== Book sources ==
- Glorieux, Guillaume, 2004: Le Château de Condé – Demeure des Princes. Paris: Somogy. ISBN 2-85056-759-0.
