= Evelyn Eaton =

Canadian writer (1902–1983)

Evelyn Sybil Mary Eaton (22 December 1902 – 17 July 1983) was a Canadian novelist, short-story writer, poet and academic known for her early novels set in New France, and later writings which explored spirituality.

== Life ==
Born in Montreux, Switzerland, Eaton was the daughter of Canadians Lieutenant-Colonel Daniel Isaac Vernon Eaton, an army officer from Nova Scotia, and Myra Fitzrandolph of New Brunswick. Eaton was the younger of two daughters. Lt.-Col. Eaton was killed in 1917, while directing the artillery assault at the battle of Vimy Ridge in France, when Evelyn Eaton was just 14. Evelyn's older sister, Helen Moira, would marry Sir John Lindsay Dashwood of the Dashwood Baronets.

Educated at the Netherwood School in Rothesay, New Brunswick, Heathfield School in Ascot, England, and at the Sorbonne in Paris, Eaton rejected many of the social conventions of her time and class, giving birth out of wedlock to a daughter while at the Sorbonne. She wrote poetry from an early age, publishing the first, "The Interpreter", in 1923. Two novels written in 1938 and 1939 received little notice, but in 1940, the publication of Quietly My Captain Waits, a novel set in Acadia (now Nova Scotia) in the early days of French settlement (New France), brought her commercial success. She became an American citizen in 1945. A series of novels set in New France followed, as did a teaching appointment at Columbia University from 1949 to 1951, a Visiting Lecturership at Sweet Briar College, Virginia from 1951 to 1960, and a position as Writer in Residence with the Huntingdon Hartford Foundation in 1960 and 1962.

Eaton's 1965 novel The King Is A Witch is a historical novel about King Edward III. The King Is A Witch depicts Edward and some of his retinue as secret followers of a pre-Christian "Old Faith". The novel was influenced by the ideas of James George Frazer and Margaret Murray.

As described in 1974 autobiography, The Trees and Fields Went the Other Way Eaton had always felt that she had some Native American or First Nations heritage, and in the 1950s she began to read books about Native American religions. A series of short stories published in The New Yorker, four more novels, a volume of poetry, and a Ballet-oratorio would grow out of Eaton's continuing promotion of what she believed were First Nations' spiritual practices.

In 1966, the Evelyn Sybil Mary Eaton Collection, a repository for her books, manuscripts, and personal papers, was established in the Mugar Memorial Library at Boston University.

== Partial bibliography ==
- 1923:The Interpreter
- 1925:The Encircling Mist
- 1928:Hours of Isis
- 1938:Summer Dust
- 1938:Pray to the Earth
- 1940:Quietly My Captain Waits
- 1942:Restless are the Sails
- 1943:Birds before Dawn
- 1943:The Sea is So Wide
- 1945:In What Torn Ship
- 1946:Journey to a War
- 1946:The Heart in Pilgrimage
- 1946:Every Month was May
- 1949:The North Star is Nearer
- 1950:Give Me Your Golden Hand
- 1952:By Just Exchange
- 1954:Flight
- 1955:The Small Hour
- 1959:I Saw My Mortal Sight
- 1965:The King is a Witch
- 1967:The Progression a Ballet-oratorio
- 1969:Go ask the River
- 1971:Love is Recognition
- 1974:The Trees and Fields Went the Other Way
- 1974:Snowy Earth Comes Gliding
- 1978:I Send a Voice
- 1982:The Shaman and the Medicine Wheel
- 1988:Joy Before Night, the Last Years of Evelyn Eaton A biography of Evelyn Eaton, written by her daughter Terry Eaton

== See also ==
- List of Canadian writers
- List of American writers
