= Jean-François Leriget de La Faye =

French diplomat, art collector, and poet

Jean-François Leriget de La Faye (1674, Vienne, Dauphiné – 11 July 1731, Paris) was a French diplomat, wealthy landowner and art collector, poet, and member of the Académie française for a single year.

At one time a musketeer, through social connections La Faye became a member of the court of Louis XIV. His position was head of the royal cabinet, and private secretary and special adviser to the King on matters such as finding a wife for the young Louis XV. He also performed various diplomatic missions in London, Genoa and Utrecht, including involvement in negotiating the Treaty of Utrecht, and was also a director of the French East India Company. Another De Faye traveled to Madagascar and thence to Surat where he seconded the director François Caron. He died there in 1669.

Often classified first as a poet, La Faye's work was indeed approvingly quoted by his correspondent Voltaire and others, but his work tended towards light verse and he was not prolific. His most well-known work was likely the Ode to Worms, published in the Mercure de France.

La Faye was the owner of an extensive art collection, two hotels in Paris, and another in Versailles. When he acquired the ancient château de Condé in 1719, he commissioned the most fashionable artists of his time and the architect Giovanni Niccolò Servandoni for elaborate improvements. For the interior decoration he hired François Lemoyne and his disciple François Boucher; Antoine Watteau and his disciple Nicolas Lancret; as well as Jean-Baptiste Oudry.
