= Condé-en-Brie =

- Commune
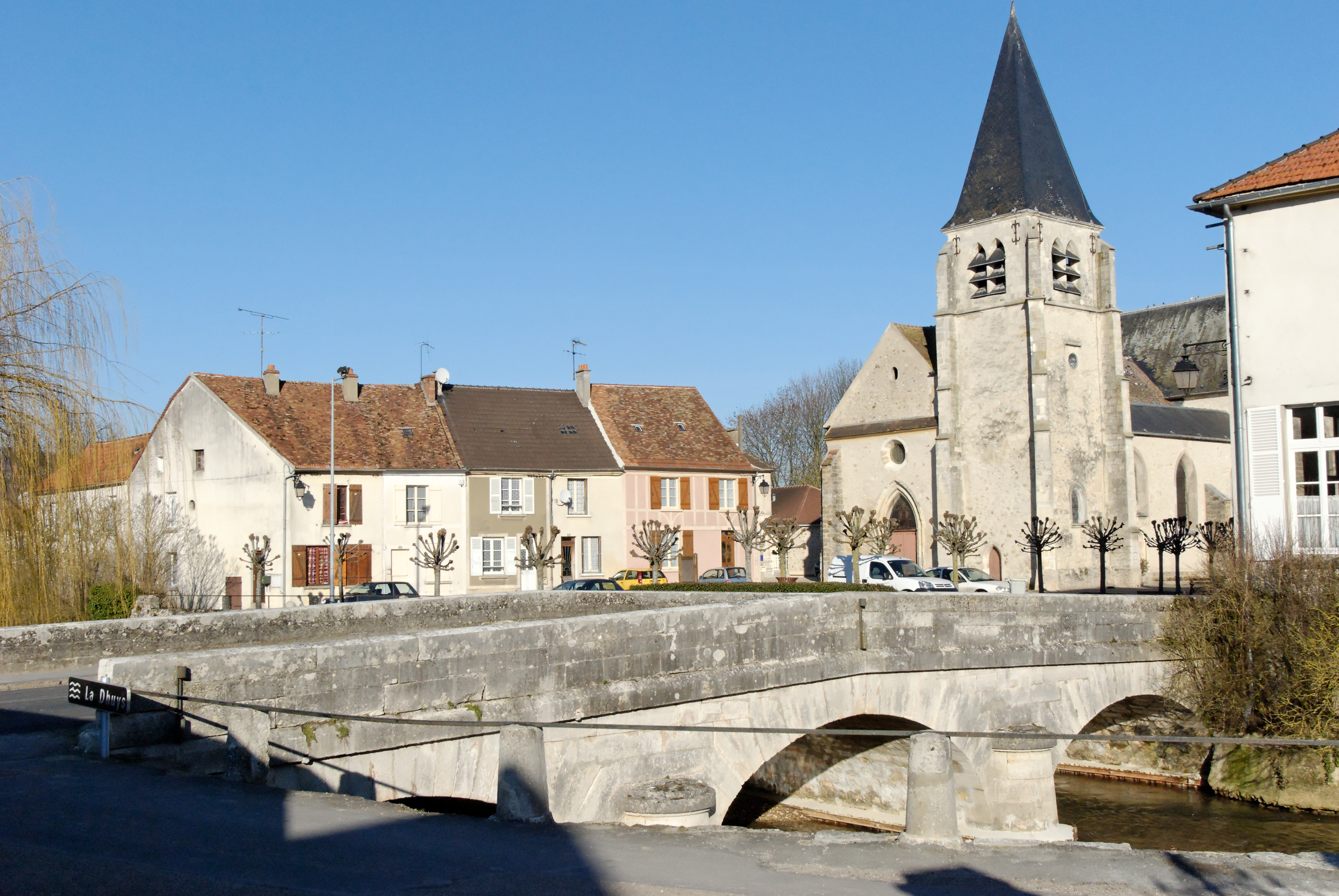
- The centre of Condé-en-Brie

- Coat of arms
- Location of Condé-en-Brie
- Location within France Location within Hauts-de-France
- Coordinates: 49°00′20″N 3°33′25″E
- Country: France
- Region: Hauts-de-France
- Department: Aisne
- Arrondissement: Château-Thierry
- Canton: Essômes-sur-Marne
- Intercommunality: CA Région de Château-Thierry

Government
  - Mayor (2026–32): Bertrand Hume
- Area^{1}: 4.56 km^{2} (1.76 sq mi)
- Elevation: 83 m (272 ft)
- Highest elevation: 221 m (725 ft)
- Lowest elevation: 75 m (246 ft)
- Population (2023): 654
  - Density: 143/km^{2} (371/sq mi)
- Time zone: UTC+01:00 (CET)
  - Summer (DST): UTC+02:00 (CEST)
- INSEE/Postal code: 02209 /02330
- ^{1} French Land Register data, which excludes lakes, ponds, glaciers > 1 km^{2} (0.386 sq mi or 247 acres) and river estuaries.

Condé-en-Brie (French pronunciation: [kɔ̃de ɑ̃ bʁi], literally Condé in Brie) is a commune in the Aisne department in Hauts-de-France in northern France.

The chateau of the family of the Marquis de Sade was located at the Condé-en-Brie.

== Population ==
Historical population
Year	Pop.	±% p.a.
1968	592	—
1975	653	+1.41%
1982	609	−0.99%
1990	591	−0.37%
1999	626	+0.64%
2007	637	+0.22%
2012	658	+0.65%
2017	685	+0.81%
2023	654	−0.77%
Source: INSEE

== See also ==
- Princes of Condé
- Château de Condé
- Communes of the Aisne department
