= Robert of Bar, Count of Marle =

French nobleman (1390–1415)

Robert of Bar
- Born: 1390
- Died: 25 October 1415 (aged 24–25); Agincourt
- Noble family: House of Montbéliard
- Spouse: Jeanne de Béthune
- Issue: Jeanne
- Father: Henry of Bar
- Mother: Marie I de Coucy

Robert of Bar (1390 – 25 October 1415) was Lord of Marle between 1397 and 1413, Count of Marle between 1413 and 1415 and Count of Soissons between 1412 and 1415.

He was the only child of Henry of Bar and Marie I de Coucy, Countess of Soissons. His great-grandfather was Edward III.

Because his father was the eldest son of Robert I of Bar, Robert claimed the Duchy of Bar. He only renounced his claims after a large financial compensation and the elevation of Marle to a County. In 1412 he also became Count of Soissons.
Robert was one of the many French casualties at the Battle of Agincourt.

Robert married in 1409 Jeanne de Béthune, Viscountess of Meaux (d. 1450), daughter of Robert VIII de Béthune, Viscount of Meaux. They had one child, a daughter:

- Jeanne de Bar, Countess of Marle and Soissons, Dame d'Oisy, Viscountess of Meaux suo jure (1415 – 14 May 1462), married Louis de Luxembourg, Count of Saint-Pol, of Brienne, de Ligny, and Conversano by whom she had seven children.

== Sources ==
- Souchal, Geneviève (1974). Masterpieces of Tapestry from the Fourteenth to the Sixteenth Century. Translated by Oxby, Richard A.H. Metropolitan Museum of Art.
- Sullivan, Karen (1999). The Interrogation of Joan of Arc. University of Minnesota Press. ISBN 978-0-8166-3268-8.
- Wylie, James Hamilton (1919). The Reign of Henry the Fifth: 1415–1416. Vol. II. Cambridge at the University Press.
