= Catherine of Austria, Lady of Coucy =

Catherine of Austria
- Lady of Coucy; Burgravine of Magdeburg
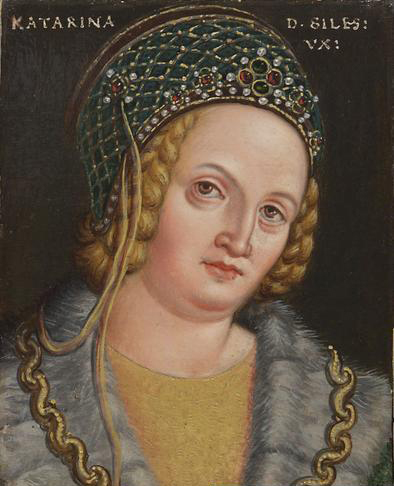
- Catherine of Austria by Anton Boys
- Born: 9 February 1320; Vienna
- Died: 28 September 1349 (aged 29); Vienna
- Burial: Königsfelden
- Spouse: Enguerrand VI de Coucy; Konrad von Hardeck, Burgrave of Magdeburg
- Issue: Enguerrand VII de Coucy
- House: House of Habsburg
- Father: Leopold I, Duke of Austria
- Mother: Catherine of Savoy

Catherine of Austria (German: Katharina von Habsburg; French: Catherine d'Autriche; 9 February 1320 – 28 September 1349) was the daughter of the Habsburg Duke Leopold I of Austria and the wife successively of the French nobleman Enguerrand VI, Lord of Coucy, and the German Konrad von Hardeck, Burgrave of Magdeburg.

== Early life and family ==
Catherine was the older of two daughters born to Leopold I, Duke of Austria and his wife Catherine of Savoy. Her younger sister was Agnes of Austria, who married Bolko II the Small, Duke of Świdnica.

Her father died when Catherine was 6 years of age, and she and 4-year-old Agnes were placed under the guardianship of their paternal uncles, Frederick the Fair and Albert II, Duke of Austria.

== Marriages ==
At the age of 18, Catherine married her first husband Enguerrand VI, Lord of Coucy, a French nobleman. The marriage contract was signed at Vincennes on 25 November 1338. The marriage produced one son, Enguerrand. The couple were married for eight years when in 1346, Enguerrand VI was killed in one of a series of battles which ended with the Battle of Crécy on 26 August 1346, as part of the Hundred Years' War between France and England. Their son Enguerrand succeeded his father as Lord of Coucy, and he later married Isabella, eldest daughter of King Edward III of England.

Catherine remarried nearly two years after her first husband's death in February 1348 to Konrad, Burgrave of Magdeburg. The couple were married for just over a year when Konrad succumbed to the Black Death on 25 September 1349, Catherine herself dying three days later; she was buried at Königsfelden. She was outlived by her son Enguerrand.

== Sources ==
- Miller, William (1921). Essays on the Latin Orient. Cambridge at the University Press.
