= Battle of Nicopolis =

1396 battle during the Ottoman wars in Europe

- Part of the Ottoman wars in Europe and the Crusades
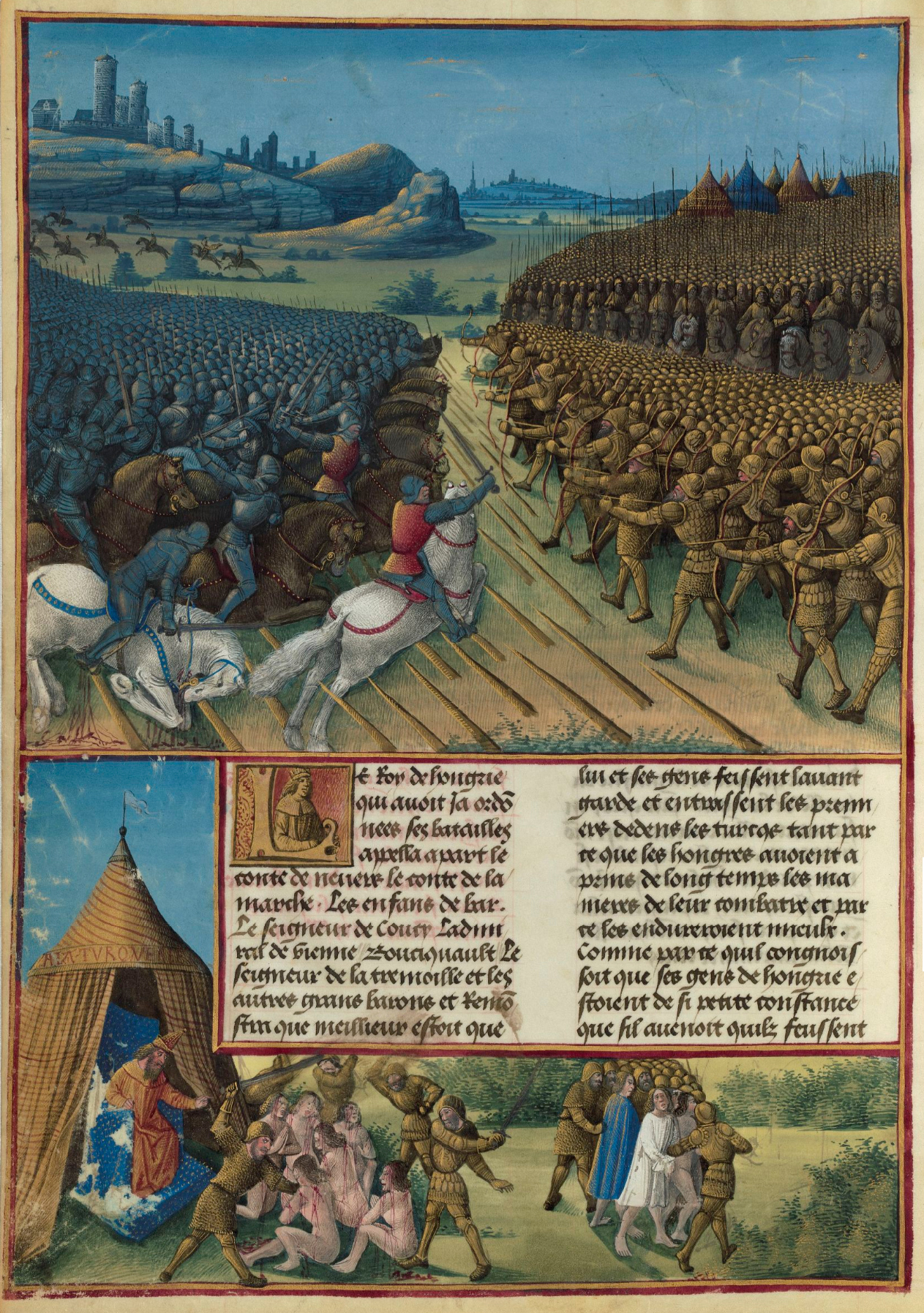
- Miniature by Jean Colombe (c. 1475)
Date	25 September 1396
Location	Nicopolis, Ottoman Sultanate 43°42′21″N 24°53′45″E
Result	Ottoman victory
Territorial changes	Crusader failure to capture Nicopolis from the Ottomans

Belligerents
Ottoman Sultanate; Moravian Serbia (Note: Vassal state of the Ottoman Empire)	Crusade: Kingdom of Hungary; Holy Roman Empire; Kingdom of France; Duchy of Burgundy; Kingdom of Croatia; Principality of Wallachia; Knights Hospitaller; Republic of Venice; Republic of Genoa; Tsardom of Vidin; Teutonic Knights; Byzantine Empire; County of Cilli; District of Branković

Commanders and leaders
Bayezid I; Çandarlı Ali Pasha; Kara Timurtaş Pasha; Evrenos Bey; Stefan Lazarević	Sigismund, King of Hungary and Croatia; Mircea the Elder; Stibor of Stiboricz; Nicholas II Garai; Philip, Count of Eu (POW); Jean II Le Maingre (POW); John, Count of Nevers (POW); Enguerrand de Coucy (POW); Jean de Vienne †; Jean de Carrouges †; Leonhard Reichartinger †; Stephen II Lackfi; Ivan Sratsimir (executed); Philibert de Naillac; Vuk Branković (POW)

Strength
10,000–20,000	17,000–20,000

Casualties and losses
Considerable losses	Most of the Crusader army killed or captured; 14,000 knights captured; 300–3,000 prisoners executed
- Location within Europe

The Battle of Nicopolis took place on 25 September 1396 and resulted in the rout of an allied Crusader army, assisted by the Venetian navy, at the hands of an Ottoman force, raising the siege of the Danubian fortress of Nicopolis and leading to the end of the Second Bulgarian Empire. It is often referred to as the Crusade of Nicopolis, as it was one of the last major Crusades of the Middle Ages, together with the Crusade of Varna in 1443–1444. By their victory at Nicopolis, the Turks discouraged the formation of European coalitions against them. They maintained their pressure on Constantinople, tightened their control over the Balkans, and became a greater threat to Central Europe.

== Background ==
There were many minor crusades in the 14th century, undertaken by individual kings or knights. Most recently there had been a failed crusade against Tunisia in 1390, and there was ongoing warfare in northern Europe along the Baltic coast. After the Battle of Kosovo in 1389, the Ottomans had conquered most of the Balkans and had reduced the Byzantine Empire to the area immediately surrounding Constantinople, which they blockaded from 1394 on.

In 1393 the Bulgarian tsar Ivan Shishman had lost Nicopolis — his temporary capital — to the Ottomans, while his brother, Ivan Stratsimir, still held Vidin but had been reduced to an Ottoman vassal. In the eyes of the Bulgarian boyars, despots, and other independent Balkan rulers, the crusade was a great chance to reverse the course of the Ottoman conquest and take back the Balkans from Islamic rule. In addition, the front line between Islam and Christianity had been moving slowly towards the Kingdom of Hungary. The Kingdom of Hungary was now the frontier between the two religions in Eastern Europe, and the Hungarians were in danger of being attacked themselves. The Republic of Venice feared that Ottoman control of the Balkan peninsula, which included Venetian territories like parts of Morea and Dalmatia, would reduce their influence over the Adriatic Sea, Ionian Sea, and Aegean Sea. The Republic of Genoa, on the other hand, feared that if the Ottomans were to gain control over River Danube and the Turkish Straits, they would eventually obtain a monopoly over the trade routes between Europe and the Black Sea, where the Genoese had many important colonies like Caffa, Sinop, and Amasra. The Genoese also owned the citadel of Galata, located at the north of the Golden Horn in Constantinople, to which Bayezid had laid siege in 1395.

In 1394, Pope Boniface IX proclaimed a new crusade against the Turks, although the Western Schism had split the papacy in two, with rival popes at Avignon and Rome, and the days when a pope had the authority to call a crusade were long past.

The two decisive factors in the formation of the last crusade were the ongoing Hundred Years' War between Richard II's England and Charles VI's France and the support of Philip II, Duke of Burgundy. In 1389, the war had ground to one of its periodic truces. Further, in March 1395, Richard II proposed a marriage between himself and Charles VI's daughter Isabella in the interests of peace and the two kings met in October 1396 on the borders of Calais to agree to the union and to lengthen the Truce of Leulinghem. The support of Burgundy, among the most powerful of the French nobles, was also vital. In 1391, Burgundy, trying to decide between sending a crusade to either Prussia or Hungary, sent his envoy Guy de La Trémoille to Venice and Hungary to evaluate the situation. Burgundy originally envisioned a crusade led by himself and the Dukes of Orléans and Lancaster, though none would join the eventual crusade. It was very unlikely that defense against the Turks was considered a particularly important goal of the crusade. Burgundy's interest in sponsoring the crusade was in increasing his and his house's prestige and power and, historian Barbara Tuchman notes, "since he was the prince of self-magnification, the result was that opulent display became the dominant theme; plans, logistics, intelligence about the enemy came second, if at all." In 1394, Burgundy extracted 120,000 livres from Flanders, sufficient to begin preparations for a crusade, and in January 1395 sent word to King Sigismund of Hungary that an official request to the King of France would be accepted.

In August, Sigismund's delegation of four knights and a bishop arrived at the court of Paris to paint a description of how "40,000" Turks were despoiling and imperilling Christian lands and beg, on Sigismund of Hungary's behalf, for help. Charles VI, having secured a peace with England through the marriage of his daughter, was able to reply that it was his responsibility to protect Christianity and punish Sultan Bayezid. French nobility responded enthusiastically to the declaration; Philip of Artois, Count of Eu, the Constable of France, and Jean II Le Maingre, the Marshal of France, declared participation in the crusade the duty of every "man of valor". Another major participant was John I, future Duke of Burgundy and Count of Nevers at the time. He was one of the principal leaders of the French forces sent to aid in the war. John's bravery during the battle earned him the cognomen Fearless (Sans-Peur).

== Strength of forces ==
According to the Chronica Hungarorum, King Sigismund of Hungary was so delighted at the sight of the large army gathered around him in Buda, he exclaimed in joy: "Who would be so bold as to dare to resist us? If the enormous weight of the sky were to fall on us, with spears that we carry, we would also hold it up so that no harm would come to us."

The number of combatants is heavily contested in historical accounts. Historian Tuchman notes the Battle of Nicopolis was considered so significant that the number of combatants given by medieval chroniclers ranges as high as 400,000, with each side insisting that the enemy outnumbered them two-to-one, which for the crusaders offered some solace for their defeat and for the Turks increased the glory of their victory. The oft-given figure of 100,000 crusaders is dismissed by Tuchman, who claims that 100,000 men would have taken a month to cross the Danube at Iron Gate, while the crusaders took eight days.

The closest record to a first-person account was made by Johann Schiltberger, a German follower of a Bavarian noble, who witnessed the battle at the age of 16 and was captured and enslaved for 30 years by the Turks before returning home, at which time he wrote a narrative of the battle estimating the crusader strength at the final battle at 17,000, though he also overestimated Turkish forces as a wildly inflated 200,000. German historians of the 19th century attempting to estimate the combatants on each side came to the figures of about 7,500–15,000 Christians and about 12,000–20,000 Turks, while noting that, from the point of logistics, it would have been impossible for the countryside around Nicopolis to have supplied food and fodder for scores of thousands of men and horses. (Medieval armies acquired supplies by taking them from the surrounding area as they marched, as opposed to using the supply lines of modern armies.)

Source	Year	Affiliation	No. of crusaders	No. of Turks	Total no.	Cite
Johann Schiltberger	1427	European	16,000	200,000	216,000	
Şükrullah in his Behçetu't-Tevârih	1460s	Ottoman	130,000	60,000	190,000	
German historians of the 19th c	19th century	European	7,500–9,000	12,000–20,000	19,500–29,000	
David Nicolle	1999	European	16,000	15,000	31,000	

=== Composition of crusader forces ===
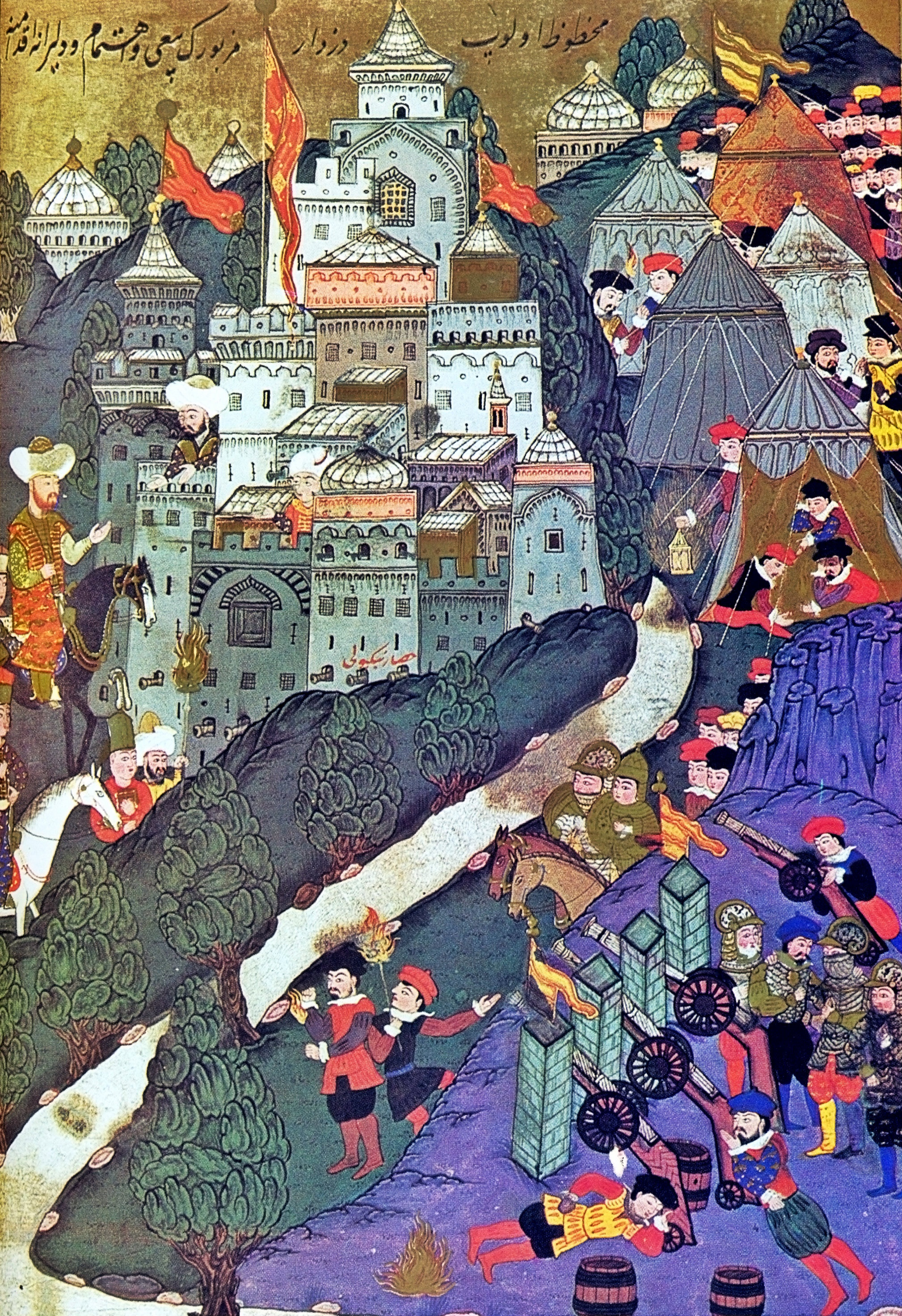
The Battle of Nicopolis, as depicted by Turkish miniaturist Nakkaş Osman in the Hünername, 1584–1588

From France, it was said about 5,000 knights and squires joined, and were accompanied by 6,000 archers and foot soldiers drawn from the best volunteer and mercenary companies; totalling some 11,000 men. Next in importance were the Knights Hospitaller of Rhodes, who were the standard bearers of Christianity in the Levant since the decline of Constantinople and Cyprus. Venice supplied a naval fleet for supporting action, while Hungarian envoys encouraged German princes of the Rhineland, Bavaria, Saxony, and other parts of the empire to join. French heralds had proclaimed the crusade in Poland, Bohemia, Navarre, and Spain, from which individuals came to join.

The Italian city-states were too much engaged in their customary violent rivalries to participate, and the widely reported and acclaimed English participation never actually occurred. The report of 3,000 English knights comes from contemporary Antonio Fiorentino, and was taken as fact by historian Aziz S. Atiya and others following him. A thousand knights would have actually amounted to "four to six thousand men and at least twice as many horses", counting foot-soldiers and other retainers. However, there are no records of financial arrangements being made in England to send a force abroad, nor of any royal preparation needed to organize and dispatch such a force. Reports of Henry of Bolingbroke or other "son of the Duke of Lancaster" leading an English contingent must be false since the presence of Henry and every other such son, as well as almost every other significant noble in the land, is recorded at the King's wedding five months after the crusade's departure. Atiya also thought that the invocation of St. George as a war cry at Nicopolis signified the presence of English soldiers, for whom George was a patron saint; but Froissart, who mentions this, claims that the cry was made by the French knight Philippe d'Eu. Furthermore, there was no collection of ransom money in England to pay for captives, as there was in every other country that had sent men to the battle. Sporadic mention in contemporary accounts of the presence of "English" may be attributed to Knights Hospitaller of the English langue subgrouping, who joined their comrades for the crusade after leaving Rhodes (where the Hospitallers were based at the time) and sailing up the Danube. Possible reasons for the English absence include the increasing tension between the King and the Duke of Gloucester, which may have convinced the two that they had best keep their supporters close, and the antipathy caused by the long war between the English and French, resulting in the English refusing to consider putting themselves under a French-led crusade, regardless of the recently concluded peace. One source concluded that the crusader army included, among others, 10,000 French and Burgundian men, along with 6,000 Germans, and 1,000 English men.

Nevertheless, obviously inflated figures continue to be repeated. These include 6,000–12,000 Hungarians, about 11,000 French, English and Burgundian troops, about 12,000 Wallachians led by Mircea the Elder the Prince of Wallachia, about 6,000 Germans and nearly 15,000 Dutch, Bohemian, Spanish, Italian, Polish, Bulgarian, Scottish and Swiss troops on the land, with the naval support of Venice, Genoa and the Knights of St. John. These result in a figure of about 47,000–49,000 in total; possibly up to 120,000 or 130,000 according to numerous sources, including the Ottoman historian Şükrullah who, in the 1460s, gives the figure of the crusader army as 130,000 in his Behçetu't-Tevârih.

=== Composition of Ottoman forces ===
The strength of the Ottoman forces is also estimated at 15–20,000; but inflated figures are common here as well. Numerous sources provide estimates of the size of the army as up to 60,000 including the Ottoman historian Şükrullah, who, writing in the 1460s, gives the figure of the Ottoman army as 60,000 in his Behçetu't-Tevârih; alternately described as roughly half of the Crusader army. The Ottoman force also included 1,500 Serbian heavy cavalry knights under the command of Prince Stefan Lazarević, who was Sultan Bayezid's brother-in-law and vassal since the Battle of Kosovo in 1389.

== Journey ==
While Philip, Duke of Burgundy, had originally planned to lead the crusade along with John of Gaunt and Louis I of Orleans, all three withdrew, claiming that the peace negotiations with England required their presence, though perhaps also because none dared leave the vicinity of the throne if their chief rivals stayed. However, Burgundy retained control of the enterprise he was funding by naming 24-year-old John, Count of Nevers, the Duke's eldest son, for nominal command. Burgundy, perhaps recognizing that his son, as well as Constable d'Eu and Marshal Boucicaut, who were both under 35, lacked the necessary experience, summoned Enguerrand VII, Lord of Coucy, the most experienced warrior and statesman of the realm, and prevailed on him to be "chief counselor" to Nevers during the crusade. The ambiguity of the crusaders' command structure would prove to be crucial in the outcome. While Nevers was given a long list of "counselors", as well as another list of prominent French lords on the crusade with whom Nevers could consult "when it seemed good to him", the concept of unity of command was not yet embraced by medieval warriors. Rules of discipline for the crusade were decreed at a War Council on 28 March 1396, which included the final provision, "Item, that [in battle] the Count and his company claim the avante garde", revealing that the chivalric code continued to require knights to prove their valor by leading the charge.

=== To Buda ===
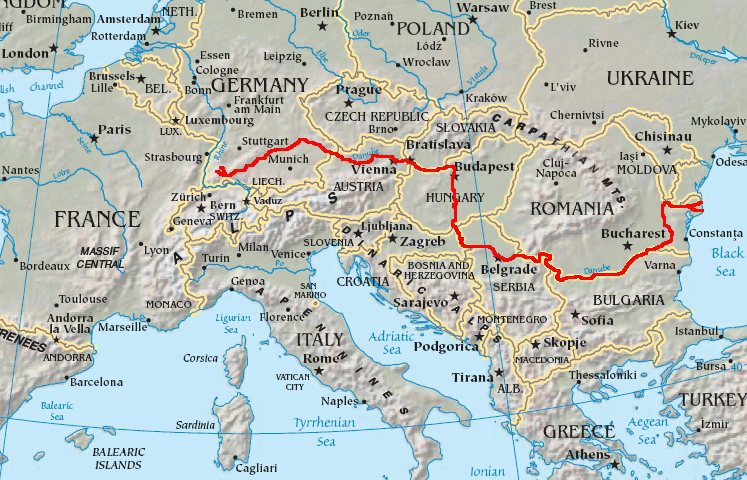
Map of Europe with the Danube marked

The crusade set forth from Dijon on 30 April 1396, heading to Bavaria by way of Strasbourg via the upper Danube, from where they used river transport to join with Sigismund in Buda. From there the crusader goals, though lacking details of planning, were to expel the Turks from the Balkans and then go to the aid of Constantinople, cross the Hellespont, and march through Turkey and Syria to liberate Palestine and the Holy Sepulchre, before returning in triumph to Europe by sea. Arrangements were made for a fleet of Venetian vessels to blockade the Turks in the Sea of Marmara and for the Venetians to sail up the Danube to meet the crusaders in Wallachia in July.

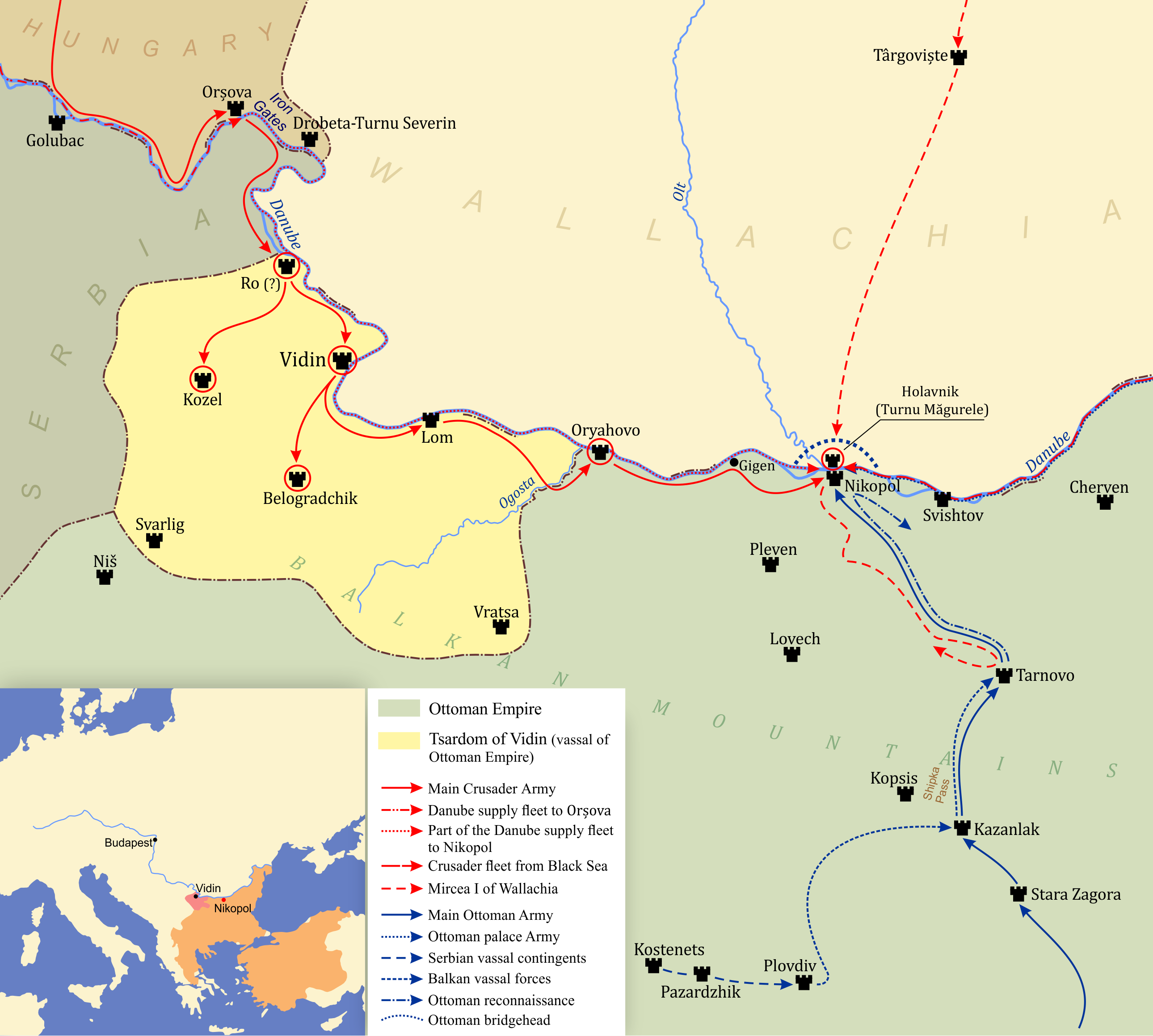
Danube Crusade and Battle of Nicopolis

Coucy was not with the crusader body as it traveled, having been detached on a diplomatic mission to Gian Galeazzo Visconti, the Duke of Milan. Furious at French political maneuvering that had removed Genoa from his influence, Gian Galeazzo had been attempting to stop the transfer of Genoese sovereignty to France and Coucy was dispatched to warn him that France would consider further interference a hostile act. The quarrel was more than political. Valentina Visconti, the wife of the Duke of Orleans and Gian Galeazzo's beloved daughter, had been exiled from Paris due to the machinations of Queen Isabeau the same month as the departure of the crusade. The Duke of Milan threatened to send knights to defend his daughter's honor but, in the wake of the disaster at Nicopolis, it was widely believed that he had relayed intelligence to Bayezid I of crusader troop movements. There is no firm evidence of this and it is likely that Gian Galeazzo became a scapegoat after the fact due to the existing animosity with France, though there remains the possibility that the Duke of Milan, who had murdered his own uncle to ensure his own power, did in fact betray the crusaders. Coucy, his diplomatic mission complete and accompanied by Henry of Bar and their followers, left Milan for Venice, from where he requisitioned a ship on 17 May to take him across the Adriatic Sea, landing in the Croatian port of Senj on 30 May before making his way overland to the rendezvous in Buda. Croatian forces led by Ban Nicholas II Garai moved towards Buda from the coastal town of Nin in June, following a session of the Croatian Parliament, and joined the royal Hungarian army led by Sigismund.

Coucy arrived well before Nevers, who had stopped in the upper Danube for receptions and festivities thrown by German princes. Nevers did not arrive in Vienna until 24 June, a full month behind the crusader vanguard led by d'Eu and Boucicaut. A fleet of 70 Venetian vessels loaded with provisions was sent down the Danube, while Nevers enjoyed yet more parties thrown by his brother-in-law Leopold IV, Duke of Austria. Nevers then asked his brother-in-law for a staggering loan of 100,000 ducats, which took time to arrange, and eventually arrived in Buda in July.

=== Buda to Nicopolis ===
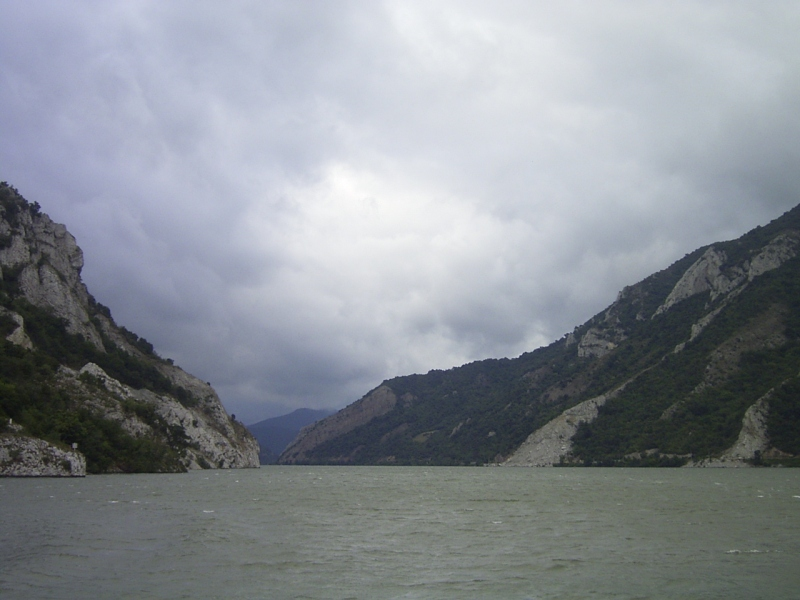
The crusaders took eight days to cross the Danube at the Iron Gate

Once the leaders had arrived, strategy had to be coordinated with Philibert de Naillac, Master of the Knights Hospitaller, and representatives of the Venetian fleet. Forty-four Venetian ships had carried the Hospitallers from Rhodes through the Aegean into the Sea of Marmara, and some continued into the Black Sea and up the Danube without engaging in battle. The fact that the Turks, who had an inferior naval presence, did not challenge the Venetians for control of the sea is seen as evidence that Bayezid and the majority of his forces were already on the European side.

The War Council in Buda was immediately the forum of a fierce dispute. The previous year, Bayezid had declared that he would attack Hungary by May, yet he had not appeared by end of July. Hungarian scouts sent out as far as the Hellespont could find no sign of him, causing the French to proclaim that he was a coward. Sigismund of Hungary assured the crusaders that Bayezid would come, and advised that it would be wiser to let the Turks make the long march to them, rather than make the same long march to find them. This strategy was rejected by the French and their allies. Coucy, acting as spokesman, stated, "Though the Sultan's boasts be lies, that should not keep us from doing deeds of arms and pursuing our enemies, for that is the purpose for which we came." Sigismund had little choice but to acquiesce, though chroniclers also write that Coucy's speech excited jealousy in D'Eu, who felt that he should have had the honor of spokesman due to his position as Constable of France.

The crusaders began to march down the left bank of the Danube, though part of the Hungarian army veered north to gather the forces of Transylvania and the Mircea the Elder-led forces of Wallachia. The remainder of the Hungarians brought up the rear of the crusader column. As the crusaders moved into Muslim-held territory, pillaging and mistreatment of the population reportedly grew. While crusaders had been reported to engage in periodic pillage and raping while passing through Germany, the indiscipline of the French reportedly reached new heights when they entered "schismatic" lands. Chroniclers also waxed eloquent on the immorality and blasphemy of the crusaders, writing detailed accounts of drunkard knights lying with prostitutes for days, despite writing from at best second-hand accounts. Tuchman cautions that such chroniclers were part of a contemporary tendency to blame the defeat of the crusade on the immorality of the crusaders, and that it is impossible to verify such claims.

At Orşova, where the Danube narrows at the Iron Gates gorge, the column crossed to the right bank using pontoons and boats over eight days. Their first target was Vidin, previously the capital of Western Bulgaria and then under Turkish control. The ruler of Vidin, Ivan Sratsimir of Bulgaria, having no desire to fight for his Turkish conquerors against an overwhelming force of crusaders, promptly surrendered. The only bloodshed was the execution of Turkish officers in the defending garrison, though the incident served to further convince the French that Turks were incapable of challenging the crusaders in the field.

The next target was Oryahovo (Rachowa), a strong fortress located 75 miles (121 km) from Vidin. Frustrated by the lack of opportunity to show their bravery in deeds of arms, the French carried out a forced march at night to reach the castle before their allies, arriving in the morning just as the Turkish forces had come out to destroy the bridge across the moat. In fierce combat the French secured the bridge but were unable to push forward until Sigismund arrived. The forces combined and managed to reach the walls before night forced the combatants to retire. The next morning the inhabitants of Oryahovo agreed to surrender to Sigismund on the assurance that their lives and property would be spared. The French promptly broke Sigismund's agreement, pillaging and massacring the town after the gates were open, and later claiming that they had taken the town by conquest because their men-at-arms had topped the walls the night before. A thousand residents, both Turkish and Bulgarian, were taken hostage and the town set ablaze. The Hungarians took the French action as a grave insult to their king, while the French accused the Hungarians of trying to rob them of the glory of victory through combat.

Leaving a garrison to hold Oryahovo, the crusaders continued towards Nicopolis, assaulting one or two forts or settlements along the way, but bypassing one citadel from which messengers escaped to inform Bayezid of the Christian army. On 12 September the crusaders came within view of the fortress of Nicopolis on its limestone cliff.

== Siege of Nicopolis ==
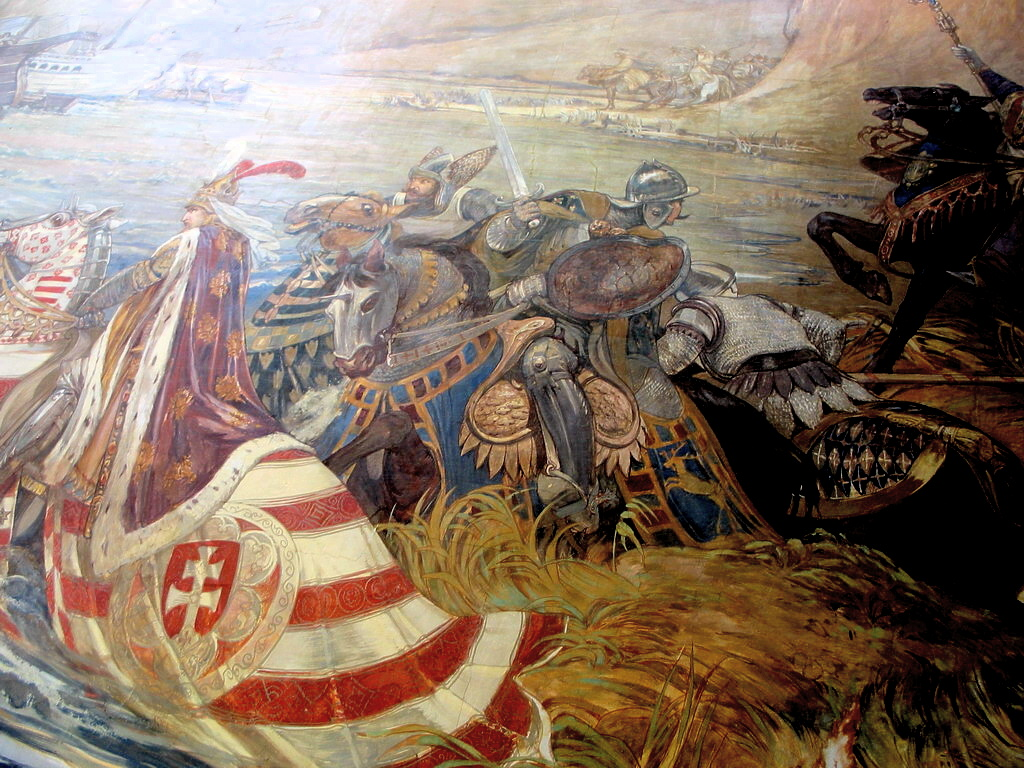
Titus Fay saves King Sigismund of Hungary in the Battle of Nicopolis. Painting in the Castle of Vaja, creation of Ferenc Lohr, 1896.

Nicopolis, located in a natural defensive position, was a key stronghold controlling the lower Danube and lines of communication to the interior. A small road ran between the cliff and river, while the fortress was actually two walled towns, the larger one on the heights on the cliff and the smaller below. Further inland from the fortified walls, the cliff sloped steeply down to the plain. Well-defended and well-supplied, the Turkish governor of Nicopolis, Doğan Bey, was certain that Bayezid would have to come to the aid of the town and was prepared to endure a long siege.

The crusaders had brought no siege machines with them, but Boucicaut optimistically stated that ladders were easily made and worth more than catapults when used by courageous men. However, the lack of siege weapons, the steep slope up to the walls and the formidable fortifications made taking the castle by force impossible. The crusaders set up positions around the town to block the exits, and with the naval blockade of the river, settled in for a siege to starve out the defenders. Nevertheless, they were convinced that the siege of the fortress would be a mere prelude to a major thrust into relieving Constantinople and did not believe that Bayezid I would arrive so speedily to give them a real battle.

Two weeks passed as the bored crusaders entertained themselves with feasts, games, and insulting the martial prowess of their enemy. Whether through drunkenness or carelessness, the crusaders posted no sentries, though foragers venturing away from the camps brought word of the Turks' approach. Bayezid was at this time already through Adrianople and on a forced march through the Shipka Pass to Tirnovo. His vassal Stefan Lazarević of Serbia joined him on the way. Sigismund had sent 500 horsemen to carry out reconnaissance in force around Tirnovo, 70 miles (110 km) to the south, and they brought word back that the Turks were indeed coming. Word also reached the besieged inhabitants of Nicopolis, who blew horns and cheered. Boucicaut claimed the noise of their celebration was a ruse as he believed that the Sultan would never attack; he further threatened to cut off the ears of anyone who discussed rumors of the Turks' approach as being damaging to the morale of the crusaders.

One of the few to concern himself with scouting the situation was de Coucy, who took a group of 500 knights and 500 mounted archers south. Learning of a large group of Turks approaching through a nearby pass, he separated 200 horsemen to carry out a feint retreat, drawing the pursuing Turks into an ambush where the rest of his men, waiting concealed, attacked their rear. Giving no quarter, de Coucy's men killed as many as they could and returned to the camp where his action shook the camp from its lethargy and drew the admiration of the other crusaders. Tuchman argues that it also increased the overconfidence of the French and again drew the jealousy of D'Eu, who accused Coucy of risking the army out of recklessness and attempting to steal glory and authority from Nevers.

Sigismund called a war council on the 24th, in which he and Mircea of Wallachia suggested a battle plan in which the Wallachian foot soldiers, who had experience in fighting the Turks, would be sent in the first attack to meet the Turkish vanguard; this was usually a poorly armed militia, normally used for pillage but used in battle to tire opponents before they met better quality Turkish forces. Sigismund claimed that this vanguard was not worthy of the attention of knights. Sigismund proposed that, once the shock of first clash had passed, the French form the front line to rush in, while the Hungarians and the other allies follow to support the attack and keep the sipahis (Turkish heavy cavalry) from sweeping around the crusaders' flanks. D'Eu denounced the proposal as demeaning to the knights, who would be forced to follow peasant footmen into battle. He reportedly stated, "To take up the rear is to dishonor us, and expose us to the contempt of all" and declared that he would claim front place as Constable and anyone in front of him would do him mortal insult. In this he was supported by Boucicaut; Nevers, reassured by the confidence of the younger French lords, was easily convinced.

With the French set on a charge, Sigismund left to make a battle plan for his own forces. Apparently within hours, he sent word to the camp that Bayezid was only six hours away. The crusaders, said to be drunk over dinner, reacted in confusion; some refused to believe the report, some rose in panic, and some hastily prepared for battle. At this point, supposedly because of a lack of spare guards, the prisoners taken at Rachowa were massacred. Even European chroniclers would later call this an act of "barbarism".

== Battle ==
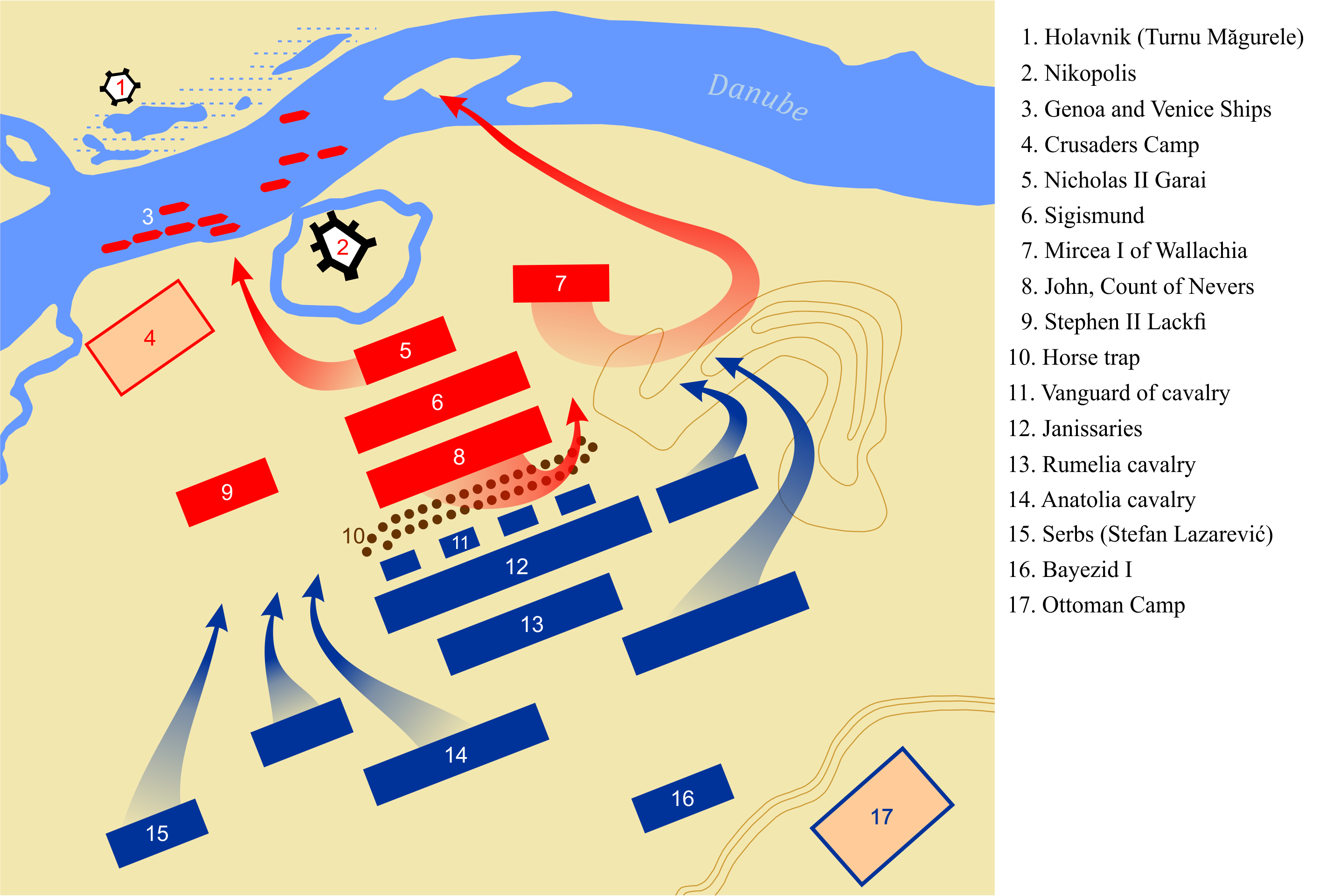
Battle map

At daybreak on 25 September the combatants began to organize themselves under the banners of their leaders. At this point, Sigismund sent his Grand Marshal to Nevers to report that his scouts had sighted the Turkish vanguard and asked for the offensive to be postponed for two hours, when his scouts would have returned with intelligence as to the numbers and disposition of the enemy. Nevers summoned a hasty council of advisors, in which Coucy and Jean de Vienne, admiral of France and the eldest French knight on the crusade, advised obeying the wishes of the Hungarian king, which seemed wise to them. At this, D'Eu declared that Sigismund simply wished to hoard the battle honors for himself and declared his willingness to lead the charge. Coucy, who declared D'Eu's words to be a "presumption", asked for the counsel of Vienne, who noted, "When truth and reason cannot be heard, then must rule presumption." Vienne commented that if D'Eu wished to advance, the army must follow, but that it would be wiser to advance in concert with the Hungarians and other allies. D'Eu rejected any wait and the council fell into a fierce dispute, with the younger hawks charging that the elder knights were not prudent, but fearful. The argument seems to have been settled when D'Eu decided to advance.

D'Eu took control of the vanguard of the French knights, while Nevers and Coucy commanded the main body. The French knights, accompanied by their mounted archers, rode out with their backs to Nicopolis to meet the Turks, who were descending the hills to the south. The Knights Hospitaler, Germans, and other allies stayed with the Hungarian forces under Sigismund. The subsequent events are obscured by conflicting accounts. Tuchman notes, "Out of the welter of different versions, a coherent account of the movements and fortunes of the battlefield is not to be had; there is only a tossing kaleidoscope." The French charge crushed the untrained conscripts in the Turkish front line and advanced into the lines of trained infantry, though the knights came under heavy fire from archers and were hampered by rows of sharpened stakes designed to skewer the stomachs of their horses. Chroniclers write of horses impaled on stakes, riders dismounting, stakes being pulled up to allow horses through, and the eventual rout of the Turkish infantry, who fled behind the relative safety of the sipahis. Coucy and Vienne recommended that the French pause to reform their ranks, give themselves some rest and allow the Hungarians time to advance to a position where they could support the French. They were overruled by the younger knights who, having no idea of the size of the Turkish force, believed that they had just defeated Bayezid's entire army and insisted on pursuit.

The French knights thus continued up the hill, though accounts state that more than half were on foot by this point, either because they had been unhorsed by the lines of sharpened stakes or had dismounted to pull up stakes. Struggling in their heavy armor, they reached the plateau on the top of the slope, where they had expected to find fleeing Turkish forces, but instead found themselves facing a fresh corps of sipahis, whom Bayezid had kept in reserve. As the sipahis surged forward in the counterattack sounding trumpets, banging kettle drums and shouting the Tekbir, the French realized how desperate their situation was and some knights fled back down the slope. The rest fought on, "no frothing boar nor enraged wolf more fiercely", in the words of one contemporary chronicler. Admiral de Vienne, to whom was granted the honor as the eldest knight of carrying the French standard into battle, was wounded many times as he attempted to rally his countrymen before being struck down. Other notable knights who were slain include Jean de Carrouges, Philippe de Bar, and Odard de Chasseron. The Turks threatened to overwhelm Nevers, and his bodyguard threw themselves to the ground in submission to plead for the life of their liege lord. Notwithstanding the declaration of jihad, the Turks were as interested in the riches that could be gained by ransoming noble captives as anyone else, and took Nevers prisoner. Seeing Nevers taken, the rest of the French yielded.

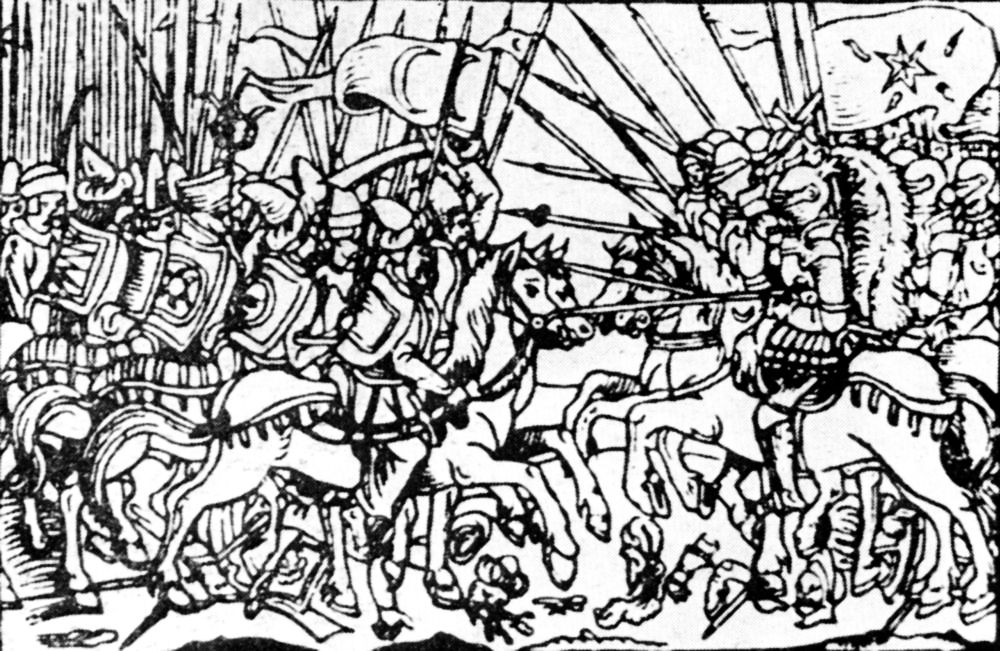
1540 depiction of the battle

The timeline of events is hazy, but it appears that as the French were advancing up the slope, sipahis were sweeping down along the flanks in an envelopment. Accounts tell of the Hungarians and other nationalities in confused combat on the plain and of a stampede of riderless horses, which Tuchman speculates pulled free from their tethers, at the sight of which the Transylvanians and the Wallachians concluded that the day was lost and abandoned the field. Sigismund, the Master of Rhodes, and the Germans fought to prevent the envelopment with "unspeakable massacre" on both sides. At this point, the Turks received a reinforcement of 1,500 Serbian knights under the command of Stefan Lazarević, which proved critical. Sigismund's force was overwhelmed. Convinced to flee, Sigismund and the Master managed to escape on a fisherman's boat to the Venetian ships in the Danube. Count Hermann of Cilli, governor of Habsburg Carniola and a cousin of Sigismund's deceased wife, led the force that allowed the escape and would later become the king's father-in-law. Bayezid and his vassal Stefan Lazarević recognized Nicholas II Garai, Lazarević's brother-in-law, fighting on Sigismund's side. A deal was made, and Sigismund's army surrendered, completing their defeat in detail.

== Aftermath ==
The execution of the prisoners in Nicopolis, in retaliation for the earlier Rahovo massacre of the Ottoman prisoners by the crusaders.

Sigismund would later state to the Hospitaller Master, "We lost the day by the pride and vanity of these French. If they believed my advice, we had enough men to fight our enemies." Chronicler Jean Froissart would declare, "Since the Battle of Roncesvalles when [all] twelve peers of France were slain, Christendom received not so great a damage."

=== Captives and ransom ===
Bayezid toured the battlefield later that day, hoping to find the corpse of the King of Hungary. His rage was only heightened by the discovery of the massacred prisoners from Rahovo. He ordered all of the prisoners assembled before him the following morning (26 September). The Turks recognized Jacques de Helly, a French knight who had served under Murad I, and had him identify the chief nobles for ransom. Coucy, Bar, D'Eu, Gui de La Tremoïlle and several others were grouped with Nevers to be spared. Those judged to be under the age of 20 were taken as slaves by the Turks.

The rest, thought to number several thousand, were bound together in groups of three or four and had their hands tied to be marched naked before the Sultan. Ordered to proceed, a group of executioners proceeded to kill each group in turn, either by decapitation or by severing their limbs from the body. Nevers and the rest of the noble captives were forced to stand beside Bayezid and watch the executions. Jean Le Maingre, called "Boucicaut", was recognized in the line, and Nevers fell to his knees before the Sultan and indicated with intertwined fingers that they were like brothers. Thus convinced that Boucicaut was worth a noble ransom, he was spared and grouped with the other high nobles. The killing continued from early morning until late afternoon, at which point Bayezid, either himself sickened by the bloodshed or convinced by his ministers that he was unnecessarily enraging Christendom against him, called off the executioners. Leaving aside the more hyperbolic account, the number of dead is said to have ranged from 300 to 3,000, though the number of dead on the battlefield was much more.

Of those who fled the battlefield, few survived. So many attempted to swim to the boats in the Danube that several sank from the load; afterward, those on the boats pushed away those trying to board. Many who attempted to swim all the way across the river drowned. Sigismund, fearful of Wallachian treachery, sailed to the Black Sea and Constantinople before making his way home by sea. Those Crusaders who made it across the Danube and tried to return home by land found that the land they were traveling over had already been stripped of forage by the retreating force of Wallachians. Reduced to wandering through the woods in rags and robbed of whatever possessions they had, many of the starved survivors died along the way. Perhaps the most famous of the few who reached home after this journey was Count Rupert of Bavaria (Ruprecht Pipan), eldest son of the future King Rupert of Germany, who arrived at his doorstep in beggar's rags and died several days later from his trials.

The captives were forced to march the 350-mile length to Gallipoli, stripped of clothing down to their shirts and most without shoes, with hands tied and beaten by their captors. At Gallipoli, the noble captives were kept in the upper rooms of a tower while the 300 prisoners that were the Sultan's share of the common captives were kept below. The ship carrying Sigismund passed within half a mile of the tower as it went through the Hellespont, for which the Turks lined the captives along the shore and mockingly called out for Sigismund to come and rescue his comrades. Sigismund, while in Constantinople, had made overtures to ransom the captives, but Bayezid was aware that Hungary's wealth had been depleted in the crusade and that richer ransoms could be had from France. After two months in Gallipoli, the prisoners were transferred to Bursa, the joint Ottoman capital located in Asia, where they awaited word of their ransom.

In the first week of December, rumors of unimaginable defeat arrived in Paris. As no certain news was to be had, rumor-mongers were imprisoned in the Grand Châtelet and, if convicted of lying, sentenced to death by drowning. The King, Burgundy, Orleans and the Duke of Bar all sped envoys to Venice and Hungary to bring word back. On 16 December merchant ships brought word to Venice of defeat at Nicopolis and the escape of Sigismund.

Jacques de Helly, the knight who had identified the nobles after the battle, had been charged by Bayezid, under his vow to return, to inform the King of France and Duke of Burgundy of his victory and demands for ransom. On Christmas, de Helly rode into Paris and, kneeling before the king, recounted the expedition, the battle, defeat and Bayezid's massacre of the prisoners. He also carried letters from Nevers and the other noble captives. Those for whom he did not carry letters were assumed to be dead, and weeping members of the court gathered around de Helly to seek more information about loved ones. According to the Monk of St. Denis, "affliction reigned in all hearts" and Deschamps wrote of "funerals from morning to eve". 9 January was declared a day of mourning throughout France and that day "it was piteous to hear the bells toiling in all the churches in Paris."

A delegation with rich gifts for Bayezid left Paris on 20 January 1397 to negotiate the ransoms. De Helly, bound by his oath to return, had already departed with letters for the captives. Gian Galeazzo's help became vital, as he had extensive contacts in the Ottoman court. Envoys were sent informing him of belated approval by the King allowing the fleur-de-lis to be added to the Visconti escutcheon, Galeazzo's first wife having been from the French royal house, and to make every effort to gain his assistance. Meanwhile, those envoys sent in early December had reached Venice and, having learned of the fate of the captives, were attempting to make their way to Bursa. Venice, which was the French conduit to the Muslim east due to her trade network, became the center for exchange of news, cash and ransomed captives.

On 13 February 1397, de Coucy, ill and perhaps suffering from battle wounds, died. Released on their own accord to seek funds in the Levant, Boucicaut and Guy de Tremoille reached Rhodes, where de Tremoille fell ill and died around Easter. French negotiators in the Sultan's court finally reached agreement on a ransom of 200,000 gold florins in June. The Count of Eu died on 15 June. With a down payment of 75,000, the prisoners were released on 24 June on their promise to stay in Venice until the rest of the ransom was paid. However, the nobles found it unthinkable to travel in less than their accustomed splendor and borrowed nearly as much as the ransom amount in reprovisioning themselves. Arriving in Venice in October after stopping in various islands to recover and borrow money, the financial transactions required to both provide the ransom and pay for the travel arrangements and living expenses of the nobles were tremendously complicated. A three-sided transaction between Burgundy, Sigismund and Venice took 27 years to settle. A plague outbreak in Venice required the nobles to move temporarily to Treviso, but still claimed Henry of Bar.

The last of the Crusader leaders (Nevers, Boucicaut, Guillaume de Tremoille and Jacques de la Marche), along with seven or eight other knights, re-entered France in February 1398. They were greeted by minstrels, parties and parades as they journeyed across the kingdom, though Tuchman notes, "the receptions probably represented not so much popular enthusiasm as organized joy, in which the 14th century excelled."

=== Broader ramifications ===
With a historian's hindsight Johan Huizinga remarked upon "the lamentable consequences of statecraft recklessly embarking on an enterprise of vital import in the spirit of a chivalrous adventure", though participants and contemporary chroniclers did not analyse the event in these terms.

After this defeat, Western Europe made no further moves to stop the Turkish advance in the Balkans until the 1440s. England and France soon renewed their war. Wallachia continued its stance against the Ottomans, repelling expeditions in 1397 and 1400. In 1402 Sultan Bayezid I was defeated and captured by Timur (Tamerlane), and Mircea cel Batran and the Kingdom of Hungary took advantage of the resulting anarchy to campaign against the Ottomans. The Hungarians, Poles and Wallachians were defeated at the Battle of Varna in 1444, and Constantinople finally fell in 1453 to the Turks, followed by the Despotate of Morea in 1460, the Empire of Trebizond in 1461, and the Principality of Theodoro in 1475, which brought an end to the last vestiges of the Eastern Roman Empire, as well as the final remaining pockets of Greek resistance against the Ottoman Turks in both the Balkans and Anatolia.

The Battle of Nicopolis is also widely regarded as the end of the Second Bulgarian Empire, since hopes for its revival had come to an end with the defeat of the Crusaders. Its last ruler, Ivan Sratsimir of Bulgaria, was captured and killed in Bursa.

By their victory at Nicopolis, the Turks discouraged the formation of future European coalitions against them. They maintained their pressure on Constantinople, tightened their control over the Balkans, and became a greater threat to central Europe.

== Sources ==
- Andrić, Stanko (2015). "A Garai főnemesi család és a Horvát Királyság / Velikaška obitelj Gorjanski i Hrvatsko Kraljevstvo [The aristocratic Garai family and the Kingdom of Croatia]". In Fodor, Pál; Sokcsevits, Dénes; Turkalj, Jasna; Karbić, Damir (eds.). A horvát-magyar együttélés fordulópontjai: Intézmények, társadalom, gazdaság, kultúra / Prekretnice u suživotu Hrvata i Mađara: Ustanove, društvo, gospodarstvo i kultura [Turning Points of the Croatian-Hungarian Co-habitation: Institutions, Society, Economy and Culture] (in Hungarian and Croatian). MTA Bölcsészettudományi Kutatóközpont Történettudományi Intézet, Hrvatski institut za povijest. pp. 481–492, 543–554. ISBN 978-963-416-019-9.
- Atiya, Aziz S. (1965). The Crusades in the Later Middle Ages. New York.
- Atiya, Aziz S. (1978). The Crusade of Nicopolis. New York.
- Földi, Pál (2000). Nagy hadvezérek: Hunyadi János (Great Warlords: János Hunyadi) (in Hungarian). Budapest: Anno Publisher. ISBN 963-9066-66-4.
- Froissart, Jean. Froissart's Chronicles. Vol. IV. National Geographic Books. ISBN 0-14-044200-6.
- Grant, R.G. (2005). Battle: A Visual Journey Through 5,000 Years of Combat. London: Dorling Kindersley.
- Housley, Norman, ed. (1996). Documents on the Later Crusades, 1274–1580. New York.
- Madden, Thomas F. (2005). Crusades: the Illustrated History (1 ed.). Ann Arbor: University of Michigan Press.
- Mango, Cyril (2002). The Oxford History of Byzantium (1 ed.). New York: Oxford University Press.
- Nicolle, David (1999). Nicopolis 1396: The Last Crusade. Campaign Series. London: Osprey Publishing.
- Nicol, Donald M. (1972). The Last Centuries of Byzantium. Cambridge: Cambridge University Press. pp. 296–317.
- Parker, Geoffrey (2005). Compact History of the World (4 ed.). London: Times Books.
- Riley-Smith, Jonathan (1995). The Oxford History of the Crusades. Oxford.
- Sherrard, Philip (1966). Great Ages of Man: Byzantium: A History of the World's Cultures. Time-Life Books. ISBN 978-0-662-83340-6.
- Tuchman, Barbara W. (1978). A Distant Mirror: the Calamitous 14th Century. New York: Alfred A. Knopf. ISBN 0-345-28394-5.
- Zsolt, Hunyadi (1999). The Crusades and the military orders: expanding the frontiers of Latin Christianity. CEU Medievalia. London: Budapest Dep. of Medieval Studies, Central European Univ. 2001. p. 226. ISBN 978-963-9241-42-8. OCLC 260026764.
- Šuica, Marko (2009). "Битка код Никопоља у делу Константина Филозофа" [The Battle of Nicopolis in the work of Constantine the Philosopher]. Историјски часопис. 58: 109–124.
- Djokić, Dejan (2023). A Concise History of Serbia. Cambridge University Press. ISBN 978-1-107-63021-5.
- Cerović, Ljubivoje (2002). "Срби у Украјини".
