= Molly Costain Haycraft =

Canadian writer

Molly Costain Haycraft (6 December 1911 – 5 June 2005) was a Canadian author. She was born in Toronto, Ontario, Canada, and spent her childhood in Philadelphia, where her father, the well-known novelist Thomas B. Costain, was an editor for The Saturday Evening Post. She was the author of several novels about women in English royal history. These include The Lady Royal, The Reluctant Queen, and Too Near the Throne. The Lady Royal centres on the life of Isabella, Countess of Bedford, during the Hundred Years War. She died in Hightstown, NJ, in 2005
