= Karen Harper =

American writer (1945–2020)

- Born: April 6, 1945; Toledo, Ohio, U.S.
- Died: April 13, 2020 (aged 75)
- Occupation: Author
- Writing career
- Language: English
- Genres: Historical fiction British monarchy
- Notable awards: The New York Times Best Seller list USA Today bestseller list 2005 Mary Higgins Clark award
- Website: www.karenharperauthor.com

Karen Harper (April 6, 1945 – April 13, 2020) was a historical fiction and contemporary fiction author. She was a New York Times and USA Today bestselling author.

== Personal life ==
Harper was born in Toledo, Ohio, and graduated from DeVilbiss High School. She obtained her bachelor's degree from Ohio University in Athens, and her graduate degree from Ohio State University in Columbus. She met her husband Don in Columbus, and lived there for thirty-five years, though they spent some time in Naples, Florida (as she considered that state her "second home").

Harper previously taught English at The Ohio State University and Westerville North High School.

Harper died on April 13, 2020, a week after her 75th birthday, after battling cancer.

== Writing career ==
Harper published Sweet Passion's Pain in 1984, and it was later published as The First Princess of Wales in 2006 by Three Rivers Press. It tells the tale of Joan of Kent and her future husband Edward, the Black Prince. Harper remarked in an author's note that the novel reminded her of the love affair between Charles, Prince of Wales, and Camilla Parker Bowles, as both shared a "less than enthusiastic endorsement" from senior royal figures. Harper has stated that the Tudor era is her favorite setting for her novels, and medieval England is a close second.

Harper was praised for her historically accurate attention to detail. She stated this is because she built up a large Tudor library over the past thirty years, took frequent trips to the British Isles, had full access to the large Ohio State University library, and interviewed many people familiar with her chosen historical topics.

== List of works ==
=== The Maplecreek series ===
1. Dark Road Home (1996)
2. Dark Harvest (2004)
3. Dark Angel (2007)

=== The Home Valley series ===
1. Fall From Pride (2011)
2. Return to Grace (2012)
3. Finding Mercy (November 2012)
4. Upon a Winter's Night (2013)

=== Cold Creek series ===
1. Shattered Secrets (2014)
2. Forbidden Ground (2014)
3. Broken Bonds (2014)

=== The Queen Elisabeth I series ===
1. The Poyson Garden (1999)
2. The Tidal Poole (2000)
3. The Twylight Tower (2001)
4. The Queene's Cure (2002)
5. The Thorne Maze (2003)
6. The Queen's Christmas (2003)
7. The Fyre Mirror (2005)
8. The Fatal Fashione (2005)
9. The Hooded Hawke (2007)

=== Standalone novels ===
- Down to the Bone (2000)
- The Baby Farm (1999)
- Shaker Run (2001)
- The Stone Forest (2002)
- The Falls (2003)
- Inferno (2007)
- Hurricane (2006)
- Below The Surface (2008)
- The Hiding Place (2008)
- Deep Down (2009)
- Down River (2010)
- The Last Boleyn (2006)
- The First Princess of Wales (originally published as Sweet Passion's Pain in 1984) (2006)
- Mistress Shakespeare (2009)
- The Queen's Governess (2009)
- The Irish Princess (2011)
- Mistress of Mourning (2012)
- The Royal Nanny (2016)
- The It Girls (2017)
- Silent Scream (2018)
- American Duchess (2019)
- The Queen's Secret (2020)
- Deep in the Alaskan Woods (2020)

== Sources ==
- Harper, Karen. "Karen Harper Printable Backlist of Available Books" (PDF). Karenharperauthor.com.
