= Marie I de Coucy, Countess of Soissons =

French countess (1366–1405)

Marie I de Coucy
- suo jure Dame de Coucy and d'Oisy suo jure Countess of Soissons
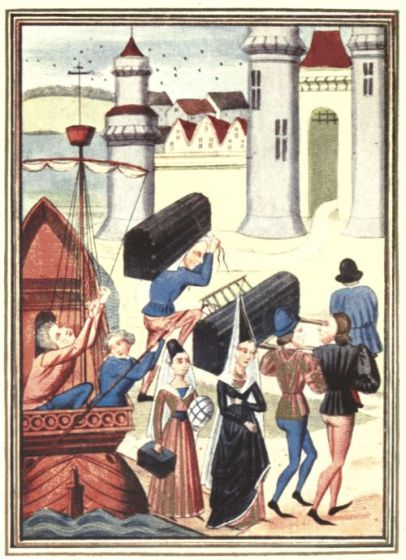
- Born: April 1366; Coucy Castle, Picardy, France
- Died: After 3 March 1405; France
- Noble family: Coucy
- Spouse: Henry of Bar (m. 1384; died 1397)
- Issue: Enguerrand of Bar; Robert of Bar; Elizabeth of Bar
- Father: Enguerrand VII de Coucy
- Mother: Isabella of England

Marie I de Coucy (April 1366 – after 3 March 1405) was Dame de Coucy and d'Oisy, and Countess of Soissons from 1397. She succeeded suo jure to the title of Countess of Soissons upon the death of her father, Enguerrand VII de Coucy, on 18 February 1397. In addition to her titles, she also possessed numerous estates in northeastern France. She was the wife of Henry of Bar, and the granddaughter of King Edward III of England and Philippa of Hainault.

== Life ==
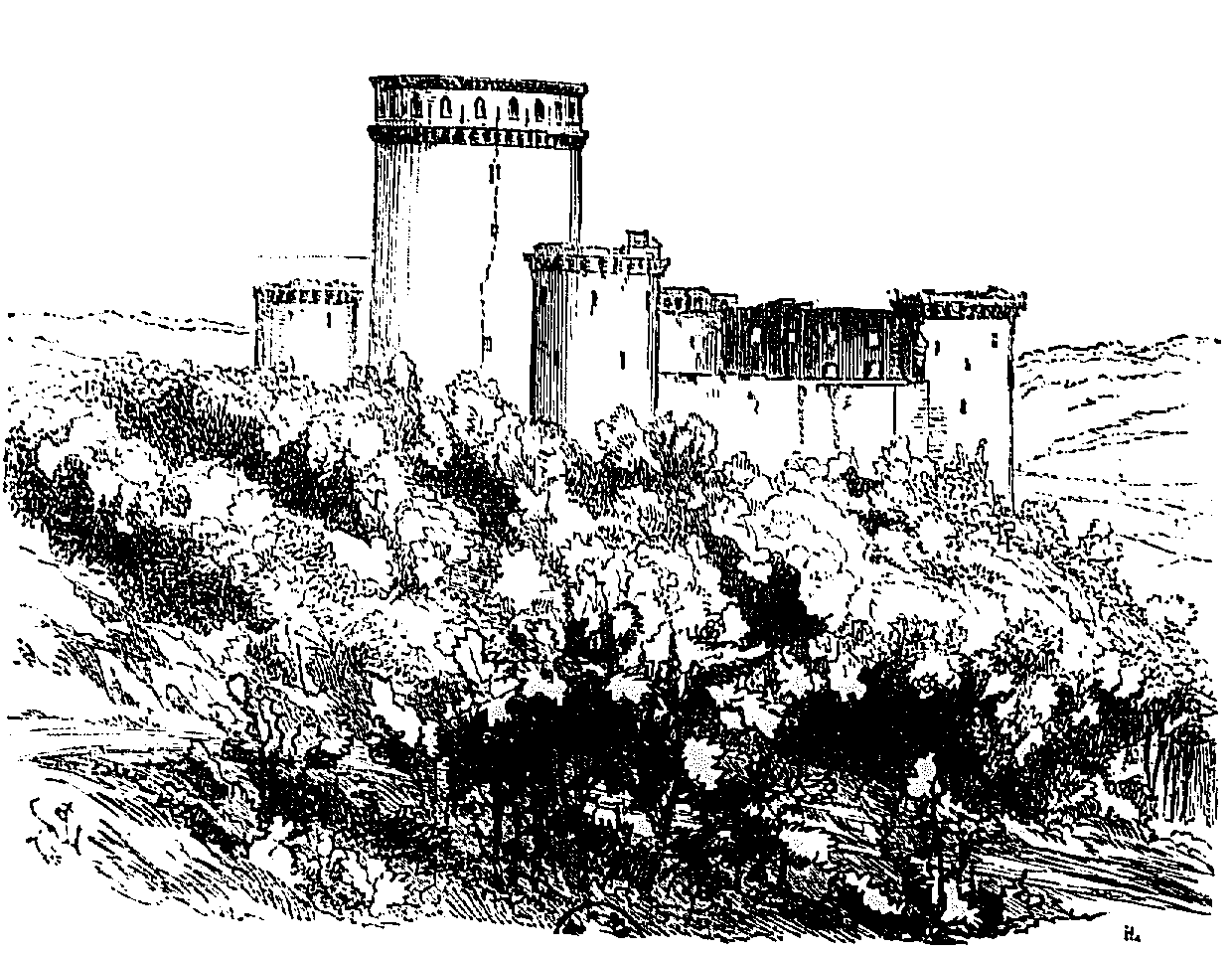
Coucy Castle, the birthplace of Marie de Coucy, and the lords of Coucy

Marie was born in April 1366 at Coucy Castle, Picardy, France. She was the eldest daughter of a powerful French nobleman, Enguerrand VII de Coucy, and Isabella of England, daughter of King Edward III of England and Philippa of Hainault. She had a younger sister, Philippa de Coucy (1367–1411), who married Robert de Vere, 9th Earl of Oxford, Marquess of Dublin, Duke of Ireland.

When Marie was about a month old, she accompanied her parents to England, where on 11 May 1366 her father received the title of Earl of Bedford and was inducted into the Order of the Garter. In 1376 at the age of ten, Marie joined the household of the French queen, Joanna of Bourbon and was educated alongside the Dauphin and his siblings.

=== Marriage ===
In November 1384, she married Henry of Bar, Marquis de Pont-à-Mousson, son of Robert I, Duke of Bar and Marie of Valois, sister of King Charles V of France. The marriage produced two sons:

- Robert of Bar, Count of Marle and Soissons (1390 – 25 October 1415), who died at the Battle of Agincourt.

By the 15th century, Marie and her husband Henry moved to the Château de Condé, which had been in the Coucy family since the end of the 12th century.

=== Legal disputes ===
Marie's mother, Isabella, died in 1382. Her father, Enguerrand, remarried in February 1386 to Isabelle, the daughter of John I, Duke of Lorraine. Upon Enguerrand's death on 18 February 1397 in a Turkish prison at Bursa, Anatolia, five months after the ferocious Battle of Nicopolis, Marie inherited his title and became the suo jure Countess of Soissons. Near the end of that same year, she was widowed. Her husband Henry was also taken prisoner at the Battle of Nicopolis and later ransomed. In October 1397, on the lengthy journey home to France, Henry of Bar died at the Crusaders' camp in Treviso after having contracted the plague during his sojourn in Venice. He was buried at the convent of the Celestines in Paris.

Marie disputed the wealthy de Coucy inheritance with her stepmother, with Marie claiming the entire inheritance, while Isabelle insisted upon receiving half. Neither of them yielded. The rich barony was described as "having castles of grandeur, with its 150 towns and villages, its famous forests, fine ponds, many good vassals, much great nobility and inestimable revenues". The women lived in mutual hostility, each in a separate castle of the domain, with her own captains and entourage of relatives, both of them endlessly pursuing lawsuits.

Marie was coerced by Louis d'Orléans into selling the barony to him in 1404. She brought at least eleven lawsuits against Orléans in an attempt to recover her property, but following a wedding feast which she had attended in 1405, Marie died suddenly. There were persistent rumours that she had been poisoned, but nothing could be proven to substantiate the allegations. Her son Robert continued the litigation, but eventually, the barony of Coucy passed to the French Crown.

== Sources ==
- Famiglietti, R. C. (1986). Royal Intrigue: Crisis at the Court of Charles VI, 1392–1420. AMS.
- Lutkin, Jessica (2010). "Isabella de Coucy, daughter of Edward III: The Exception Who Proves the Rule". In Given-Wilson, Chris; Saul, Nigel (eds.). Fourteenth Century England VI. The Boydell Press.
- Setton, Kenneth Meyer (1976). The Papacy and the Levant, 1204–1571: The Thirteenth and Fourteenth Centuries. Vol. I. The American Philosophical Society.
- Souchal, Geneviève (1974). Masterpieces of Tapestry from the Fourteenth to the Sixteenth Century. Translated by Oxby, Richard A.H. Metropolitan Museum of Art.
- Sumption, Jonathan (2009). Divided Houses:Hundred Years War. Vol. 3. Faber and Faber Ltd.

French nobility
Preceded by Enguerrand VII, Lord of Coucy	Countess of Soissons; 1397–1405	Succeeded by Louis I, Duke of Orleans
