= Isabella, Countess of Bedford =

English princess (1332–1379/1382)

Isabella
- Countess of Bedford
- Born: 16 June 1332; Woodstock Palace, Oxfordshire
- Died: 1379 or 1382
- Burial: Greyfriars Church Newgate
- Spouse: Enguerrand VII, Lord of Coucy (m. 1365)
- Issue: Marie, Countess of Soissons; Philippa de Vere, Duchess of Ireland
- House: Plantagenet
- Father: Edward III of England
- Mother: Philippa of Hainault

Isabella (16 June 1332 – 1379/1382) was the eldest daughter of King Edward III of England and Philippa of Hainault, and the wife of Enguerrand de Coucy, Earl of Bedford, by whom she had two daughters. She was made a Lady of the Garter in 1376.

== Early years ==
Isabella was Edward and Philippa's second child, and eldest daughter. Named after her paternal grandmother, Isabella of France, Isabella is believed to have been her father's favourite daughter, but less close to her mother.

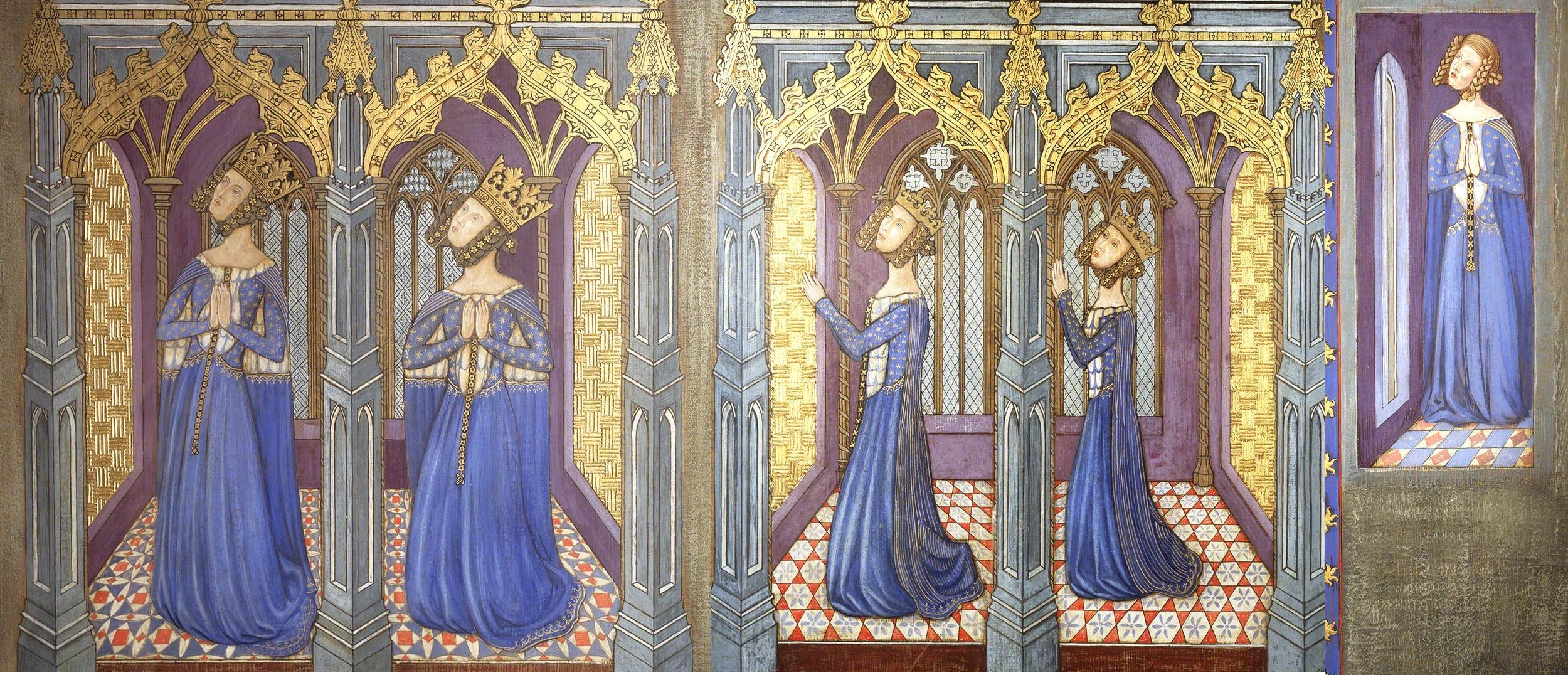
Isabella alongside her sisters and mother

Born at Woodstock Palace, in Oxfordshire, on 16 June 1332, she was a baby who was much pampered by her doting parents. She slept in a gilded cradle lined with taffeta and covered with a fur blanket. Her gowns were of imported Italian silk, embroidered with jewels and fur-lined. Isabella had, along with her siblings, a household of servants which included a personal chaplain, musicians, a noble governor and governess, and three personal ladies-in-waiting as well as a staff of grooms, esquires, clerks, butlers, cooks, and other attendants. The household was headed by Isabella de la Mote, chief maistresce of the king’s children.

As a child, Isabella was sent to the household of William and Elizabeth St Omer, which also included Isabella's older brother Edward and younger sister Joan. Isabella travelled on important occasions, such as when she and Joan celebrated the feast of St John the Evangelist in the royal chapel at the Tower of London on 27 December 1340. In February and March 1341, Isabella and her siblings went to King’s Langley to visit their mother.

== Betrothals ==
When she was just 3 years old, her father attempted to arrange a marriage between Isabella and Pedro of Castile, the Castilian King's heir; however, her younger sister Joan later became Pedro's betrothed, dying before they could actually marry.

Isabella – unusually for the times – remained unmarried until the age of 33. She had previously been the subject of various betrothal proposals; however, these had all failed to come to fruition. On 15 November 1351, when she was 19 years old, five ships were instructed to take her to Gascony where she was to marry Bernard d'Albret as had been previously arranged. He was the second eldest son of Bernard Ezi IV, Lord of Albret. At the last moment before departure, however, Isabella changed her mind, and the marriage was called off. Her father does not appear to have been angry at Isabella for her capricious behaviour as he granted her custody of Burtsall Priory in Yorkshire in 1355. He also settled the sum of 1,000 marks per annum on her.

Eventually, she was permitted to marry Enguerrand VII, Lord of Coucy, a wealthy French lord with whom she had fallen in love. Seven years her junior, he was the son and heir of Enguerrand VI, Lord of Coucy, and Catherine of Austria.

== Marriage and issue ==
Isabella's husband had been brought to England in 1360 as a hostage exchanged for the freedom of King John II of France, an English prisoner. They married on 27 July 1365, at Windsor Castle, by which time Isabella was in her thirties. Her father, Edward III, gave her a dowry of £4,000 and a large lifetime annual income, together with expensive amounts of jewellery and lands; de Coucy was restored to his family's lands in Yorkshire, Lancaster, Westmorland and Cumberland, and was released as a hostage without any need for ransom.

In November 1365, Isabella and her husband were permitted to enter France; their first daughter, Marie, was born at the family lands at Coucy in April 1366. They later returned for a visit to England; on this occasion, Enguerrand was made Earl of Bedford on 11 May 1366, which made Isabella Countess of Bedford as well as Lady of Coucy. After the birth of Isabella's second daughter, Philippa, in 1367, Enguerrand and Isabella were also made Count and Countess of Soissons by Edward. Because her husband also served the King of France as a military leader, he was frequently away from home; consequently, Isabella, though living principally with Enguerrand at Coucy, made frequent visits to her family in England. She was made a Lady of the Garter in 1376.

Isabella bore two children by her marriage to Enguerrand de Coucy:

- Marie de Coucy (April 1366 – 1405), suo jure Countess of Soissons. She married Henry of Bar, a nephew of Charles V of France, by whom she had children. After her father's death, she disputed the inheritance of his lands with her stepmother before dying suddenly. After her death, her patrimony was absorbed into the French royal estates.
- Philippa de Coucy (1367–1411), who was born at Eltham, and named after Isabella's mother. She married Robert de Vere, the Earl of Oxford, in 1371, and lived thereafter in England. She died childless.

== Death ==
Isabella was at her father's side when he died on 21 June 1377, having been urgently summoned home from France by couriers the previous April. After the accession of Richard II, Isabella's nephew, in August 1377, Enguerrand renounced his allegiance to the English Crown, resigned all of his English possessions and fought for the Valois cause in the Hundred Years War. Isabella petitioned the first Parliament of Richard's reign, claiming femme sole status since her husband’s desertion of both the marriage and country, requesting a grant of revenue and the return to her of the manor of Kendal.

Isabella died in England, separated from her eldest daughter, Marie. She was buried at Westminster Abbey on 4 May 1379 or between 17 June and 5 October 1382.

== In fiction ==
Molly Costain Haycraft's fictionalized account of Isabella's life and courtship with her husband, The Lady Royal, recounts several incidents in the lives of the princess and other members of Edward III's family, but contains a number of historical errors. Chief among these is the explanation of the book's title; according to the story, Isabella (or Isabel, as she is identified in the story) was titled Princess Royal and later promoted to "Lady Royal" by her parents. This is impossible, given that the title of Princess Royal was not created until the reign of Charles I of England.

One reviewer commented that "Edward III's proclamation of the intended marriage... conveys more of the cadence of Plantagenet Britain than do pages of Mrs Haycraft's dreary efforts." Others praise the author's attention to historical detail.

== Sources ==
- Bain, Joseph (1879). "Original Document Petition by The Lady Isabella, Countess Of Bedford, Daughter Of Edward III, On Behalf Of Herself and Her Daughter The Countess Of Oxford, To The Council Of Richard II, Respecting The Rents Of Lands at Kendal, &c., Unjustly Seized By Alice Perers". Archaeological Journal. 36 (1): 174–176. doi:10.1080/00665983.1879.10851894. ISSN 0066-5983.
- Hilton, Lisa (2008). Queens Consort: England's Medieval Queens. London: Phoenix. ISBN 9780753826119.
- Lutkin, Jessica (2010). "Isabella de Coucy, daughter of Edward III: The Exception Who Proves the Rule". In Given-Wilson, Chris; Saul, Nigel (eds.). Fourteenth Century England VI. The Boydell Press. pp. 131–148. doi:10.1017/9781846158025.008. ISBN 9781846158025.
- Hector, L. C.; Harvey, Barbara F., eds. (1982). The Westminster Chronicle 1381 – 1394. Clarendon Press.
- Ormrod, William Mark (2005). "The Royal Nursery: A Household for the Younger Children of Edward III". The English Historical Review. 120 (486): 398–415. doi:10.1093/ehr/cei120. ISSN 1477-4534.
- Ormrod, William Mark (2020). "Queens and Noblewomen in Parliament". Women and Parliament in Later Medieval England. Cham: Springer International Publishing. pp. 25–40. doi:10.1007/978-3-030-45220-9_2. ISBN 978-3-030-45220-9.
- Tuchman, Barbara W. (1987). A Distant Mirror: The Calamitous Fourteenth Century. Knopf. ISBN 9780345349576.
