= Enguerrand VI de Coucy =

14th-century French nobleman

De Coucy arms: Barry of six, vair and gules

Enguerrand VI (c. 1313 – c. 1346) was a medieval French nobleman who served as the Seigneur Lord of Coucy. He was also Lord Gynes, Sire d'Oisy, in the district of Marle, and the Sire de La Fère. He was the son of his predecessor, Guillaume, Lord of Coucy, Marle, Fère, Oisy, and Mount-Mirel, who held the titles from 1321 to 1335; and his second wife, Isabeau de Châtillon-St-Pol, daughter of Guy IV, Count of Saint-Pol.

He succeeded his father in the titles in 1335. In 1338, he married Catherine of Austria, the eldest daughter of Leopold I, Duke of Austria and Catherine of Savoy, and the granddaughter of the powerful Amadeus V, Count of Savoy. The marriage with the House of Habsburg and House of Savoy was arranged by King Philip VI himself, who was seeking foreign allies against England and to secure the loyalty of the barony of Coucy, strategically located in northern France and fortified with the massive Château de Coucy. Two pacts arranging the marriage and dowry were signed, the first in January 1337 in Paris and the second on 25 November 1338 in the Bois de Vincennes. The marriage produced only one son, Enguerrand VII, who succeeded his father.

Enguerrand VI was reportedly killed at the Battle of Crécy on 25 August 1346, but his death is also recorded as occurring as early as 1344 or as late as September 1347.

Preceded by Guillaume	Lord of Coucy; 1335–1346	Succeeded by Enguerrand VII
