= The First Princess of Wales =

1984 novel by Karen Harper

- First edition (original title)
- Author: Karen Harper
- Original title: Sweet Passion's Pain
- Language: English
- Genre: Historical fiction
- Publisher: Zebra Books
- Publication date: 1984
- Publication place: United States

The First Princess of Wales (originally published as Sweet Passion's Pain) is a 1984 historical fiction novel by American author Karen Harper. Set during the 14th-century, it follows the romance between Joan of Kent and Edward the Black Prince.

== Plot summary ==
Set during the reign of Edward III of England in the 14th-century, the novel follows the romance between Joan of Kent and Edward's eldest son, Edward the Black Prince.

== Development ==
The First Princess of Wales was written by American author Karen Harper and published as her third novel. Harper was inspired to become a writer by the Anya Seton novel Katherine, as well as her many visits to English historical sites. After publishing her first novel in 1982, Harper left her job teaching British literature to become a professional author.

Near the time of the novel's publication in 1984, Harper was in part inspired by the wedding of Charles, Prince of Wales, and Lady Diana Spencer, particularly when the newly married couple appeared on the balcony of Buckingham Palace together. Later, however, Harper felt the romance between Edward and Joan in her novel better resembled the "longtime, sometimes secret love between Prince Charles and Camilla", as the author felt both couples faced opposition from their respective families.

== Release and reception ==
The novel was first published in 1984 as Sweet Passion's Pain by Zebra Books before being re-released as The First Princess of Wales. Three Rivers Press published it in paperback in December 2006. In a 2006 review, Publishers Weekly praised the author for "breath[ing] a lust for life into history's distant icons" and for "keep[ing] the tension taut as she weaves together the many subplots into a first-rate epic. Love prevails in a grand fashion at the end."
