= Henry of Bar =

French noble (1362–1397)

Henry of Bar (c. 1362 – October 1397, in Treviso, Italy) was lord of Marle and the Marquis de Pont-à-Mousson. He was the eldest son of Robert I of Bar and Marie of Valois.

Early in his life, he was betrothed to the daughter of John I, Duke of Lorraine, Isabelle. However, the betrothal was broken and she would instead marry Enguerrand VII, Lord of Coucy.

In 1374, Henry went to the court of his uncle, King Charles V of France. In 1380, Henry was knighted at the coronation of his cousin, Charles VI. He would fight in the 1383 Flanders campaign and in the 1388 Guelders campaign. He then returned to Bar and governed it on behalf of his father, who was often immobilised by attacks of gout.

In November 1384, Henry himself married Marie de Coucy, Countess of Soissons (1366–1405), daughter of Enguerrand VII Count of Soissons & Sire de Coucy, by his first wife Princess Isabella of England, eldest daughter of King Edward III. Marie became Dame de Coucy et de Oisy following her father's death in 1397. Henry had two children by Marie:

- Enguerrand (died ca. 1400),
- Robert of Bar, who became count of Marle and of Soissons.

In 1396, Henry negotiated the neutrality of Gian Galeazzo Visconti, Duke of Milan, in dealings with the French protectorate in the republic of Gênes. He then fought on the side of the Duke of Nevers in the crusade against the Ottoman Empire, being captured at the end of the Battle of Nicopolis on 25 September 1396. He was taken prisoner and later ransomed, but died at the crusader's camp in Treviso after contracting the plague in Venice on his return trip.

== Sources ==
- Savage, Henry L. (1939). "Enguerrand de Coucy VII and the Campaign of Nicopolis". Speculum. 14 (4 Oct). The University of Chicago Press. doi:10.2307/2849531. JSTOR 2849531. S2CID 162344126.
- Setton, Kenneth Meyer (1976). The Papacy and the Levant, 1204-1571: The Thirteenth and Fourteenth Centuries. Vol. I. The American Philosophical Society.
- Souchal, Geneviève (1974). Masterpieces of Tapestry from the Fourteenth to the Sixteenth Century. Translated by Oxby, Richard A.H. Metropolitan Museum of Art.
- Sumption, J. (2009). Divided Houses: Hundred Years War. Vol. 3. London: Faber & Faber. ISBN 978-0-57124-012-8.
- Vaughan, Richard (2009). Philip the Bold, The formation of the Burgundian State. The Boydell Press.
