= Nidau =

- Municipality
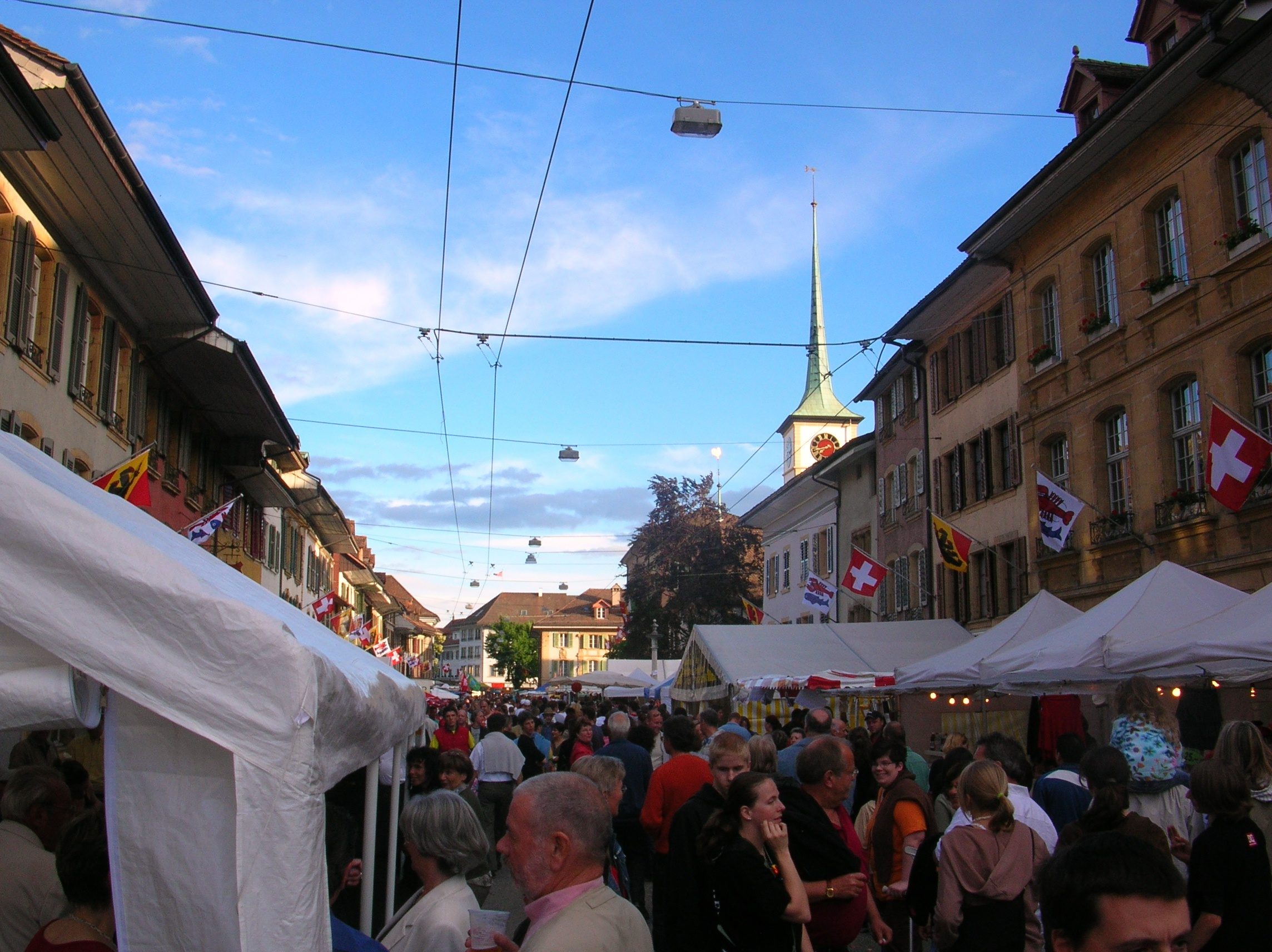
- Stedtlifest Nidau

- Flag Coat of arms
- Location of Nidau
- Location within Switzerland Location within Canton of Bern
- Coordinates: 47°8′N 7°15′E
- Country: Switzerland
- Canton: Bern
- District: Biel/Bienne

Government
  - Executive: Gemeinderat/Conseil Municipal with 7 members
  - Mayor: Stadtpräsident/Maire; Tobias Egger SPS/PSS (as of March 2014)
  - Parliament: Stadtrat/Conseil de ville with 30 members

Area
  - Total: 1.5 km^{2} (0.58 sq mi)
- Elevation: 432 m (1,417 ft)

Population (December 2020)
  - Total: 6,943
  - Density: 4,600/km^{2} (12,000/sq mi)
- Time zone: UTC+01:00 (CET)
  - Summer (DST): UTC+02:00 (CEST)
- Postal code: 2560
- SFOS number: 743
- ISO 3166 code: CH-BE
- Surrounded by: Biel/Bienne, Ipsach, Port, Tüscherz-Alfermée
- Twin towns: Schliengen (Germany)
- Website: https://www.nidau.ch/

Nidau (German pronunciation: [ˈniːdaʊ], French pronunciation: [nido]) is a municipality in the Biel/Bienne administrative district in the canton of Bern in Switzerland.

== History ==
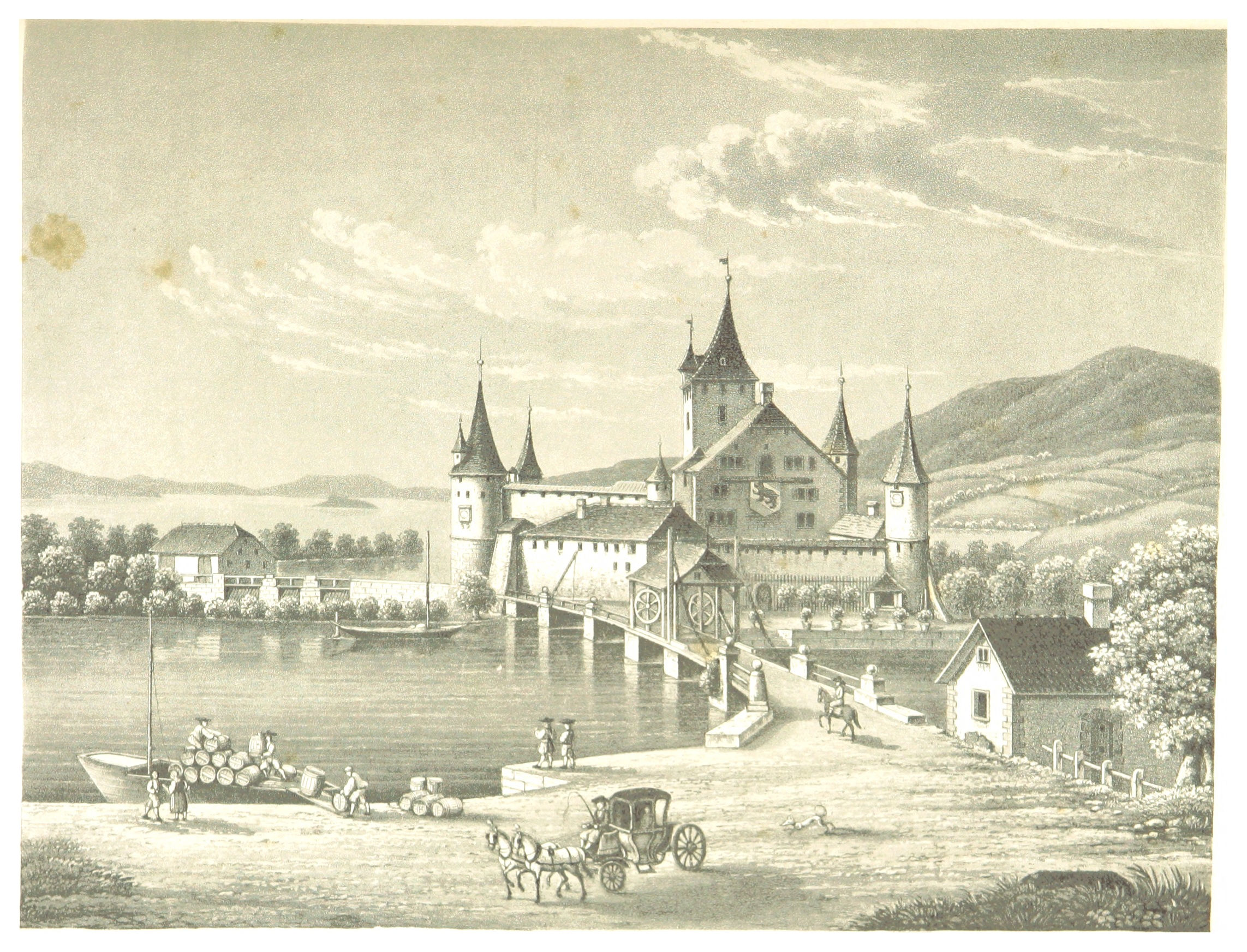
General view of Nidau (c1850)

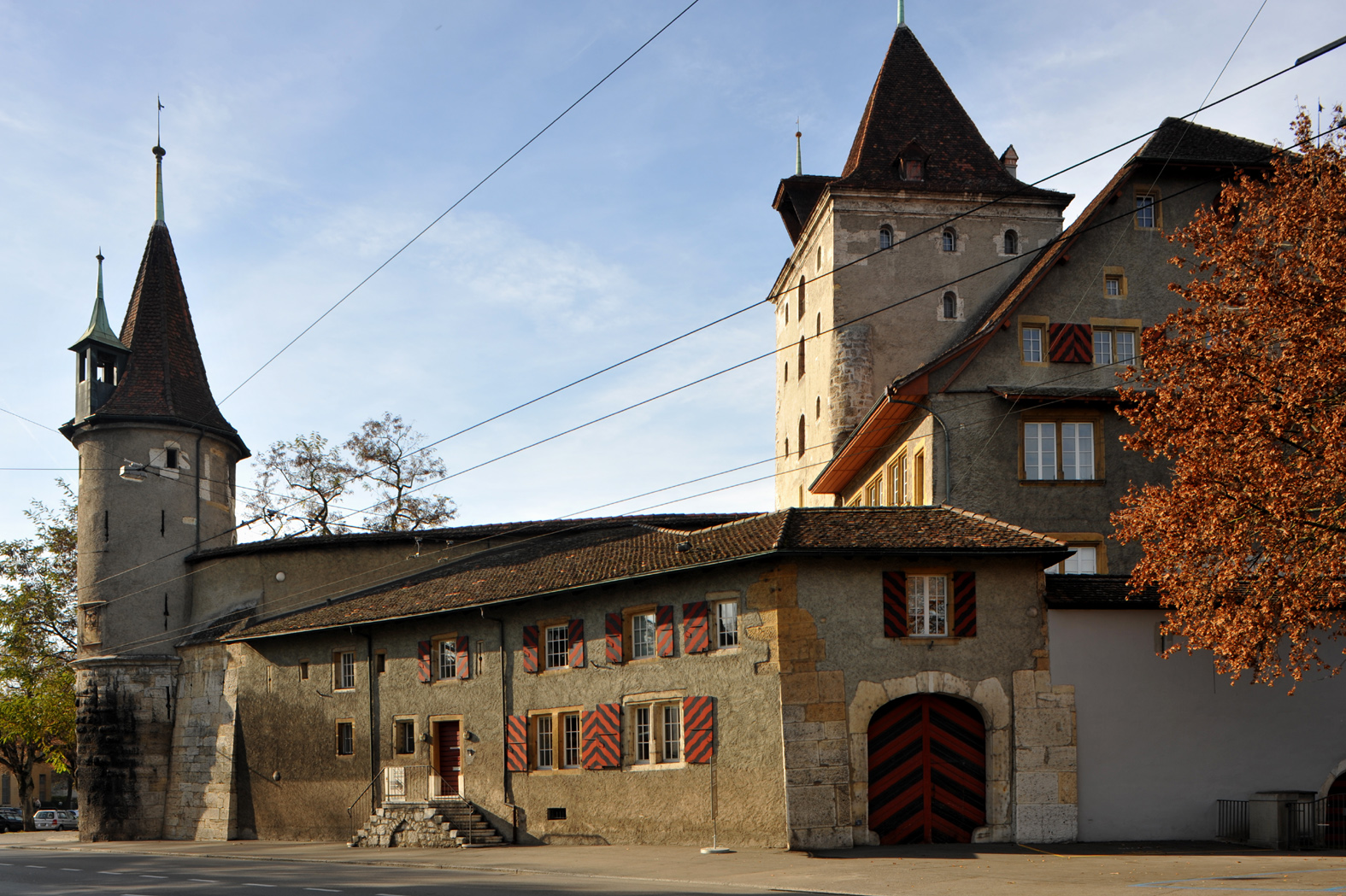
Nidau Castle

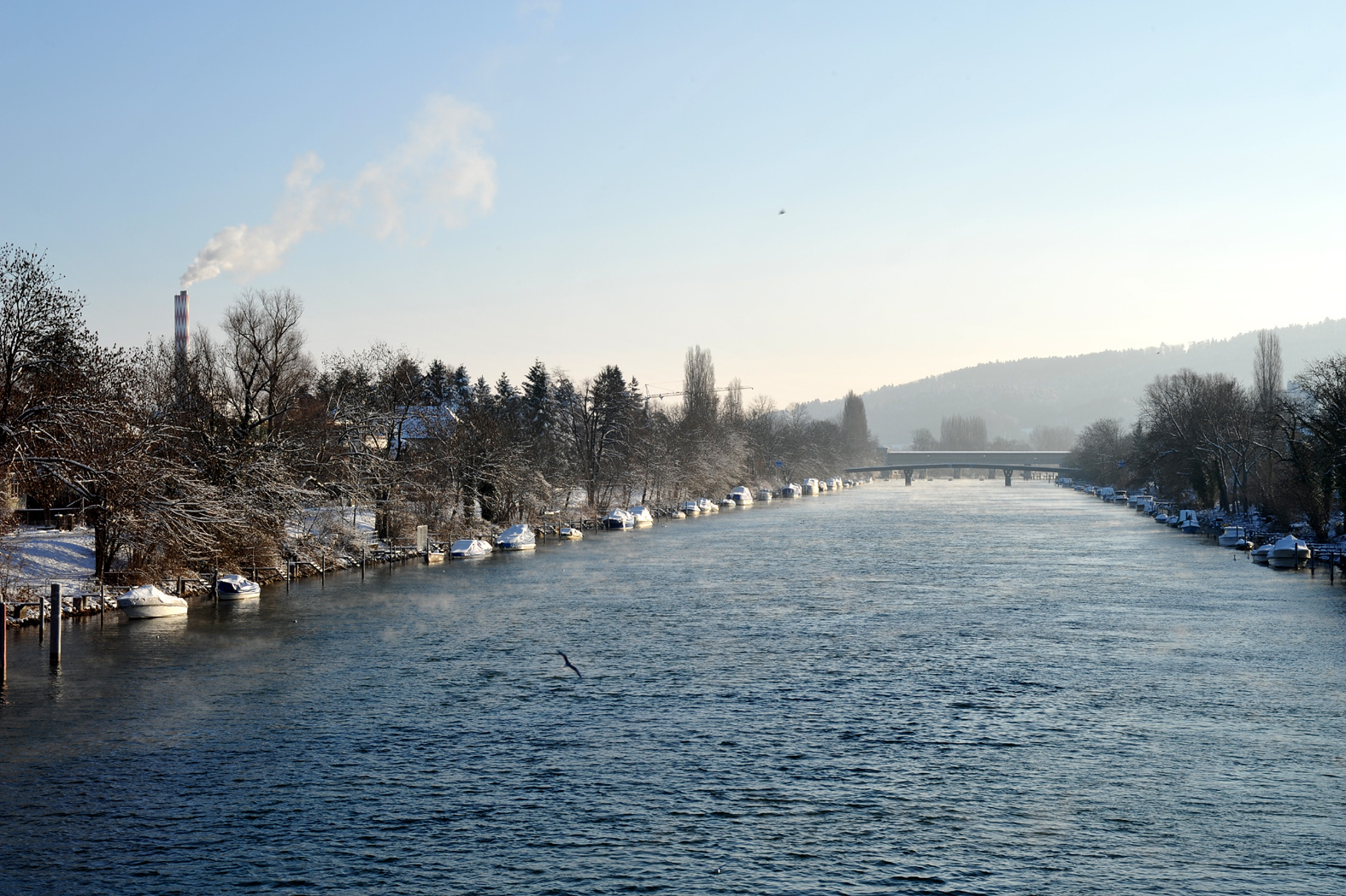
Nidau-Buren Canal

Nidau is first mentioned in 1196 as Nidowe. In 1352, it was recorded in Latin as Nydow.

The remains of a number of stilt house settlements from the Neolithic until the late Bronze Age have been found along the lake shore in Nidau. A La Tene artifact was discovered in the Thielle/Zihl canal. Several iron ingots which were probably from the Roman era were found in the old Thielle/Zihl river.

Along the river, a wooden castle was built in 1140. A second castle was built in 1180, which was replaced with the stone Nidau Castle in the early 13th century. The town was built south of the castle. It was either built or expanded just before the Battle of Laupen in 1338. The triangular town pointed toward the castle and had a main street that paralleled the river and ran north–south. Three cross streets ran west from the main street.

The last count of Nidau, Rudolf IV died in 1375 in a battle in the Gugler War. The next owner of the castle was the Prince-Bishop of Basel, Johann von Venningen. However, he was defeated in 1376 and the Counts of Kyburg acquired the castle. In 1379, Count Rudolf von Kyburg sold the castle and town to the Habsburgs. The Habsburgs then gave the castle as a fief to Enguerrand de Coucy, the former commander of the Guglers, in 1387. During the Sempach War, in May 1388, Swiss Confederation forces from Bern and Solothurn attacked and besieged the town and castle for seven weeks before taking Nidau. The castle was heavily damaged and the Swiss forces suffered heavy losses in the battle. Following the war, the town and castle were awarded to Bern in the peace settlement. Portions of the city were damaged or destroyed in fires in 1388, 1413, 1513 and 1743.

In 1425 Bern granted the town a charter, though only the 1548 version still exists. The town market and granary were first mentioned in 1411. A hospital opened in 1430 and a plague house was built in 1474. Its location on the Bern-Jura Mountains-Basel and the Geneva-Lake Constance roads as well as the shores of Lake Biel made Nidau into a natural transshipment point. Rich trade allowed the town to grow quickly. Most of the residents worked in the markets, ship building, goods transportation and hospitality. Fishing, viticulture and farming provided most of the food for the town. The local tanners were the only group that formed a guild, beginning in 1485. The guild house was built in 1500.

The town originally belonged to the parish of Bürglen (now part of Aegerten). The town church was first mentioned in 1368, when it was a filial church of Bürglen. It became a parish church in 1482 when Nidau formed its own parish. Nidau converted to the new faith of the Protestant Reformation in 1528, along with the Canton of Bern. After the Reformation, the Nidau parish included Bellmund and Port.

During the 18th and 19th century, the town was flooded several times when the river or lake rose. The Jura water correction projects of 1868–91, lowered the water level and helped protect the town from floods. The Thielle/Zihl river was constrained and the numerous side channels were filled in. The Nidau Buren canal replaced the Thielle/Zihl river as the main waterway in Nidau. It was connected to Biel/Bienne by railroad in 1857 and the two towns began to grow together. A number of new developments opened as Nidau's population grew. Today the outer quarters developments of Nidau flow seamlessly into those of Biel. Industry began to settle in Nidau in 1900, though today it is mostly home to small to medium businesses in the services sector.

== Geography ==
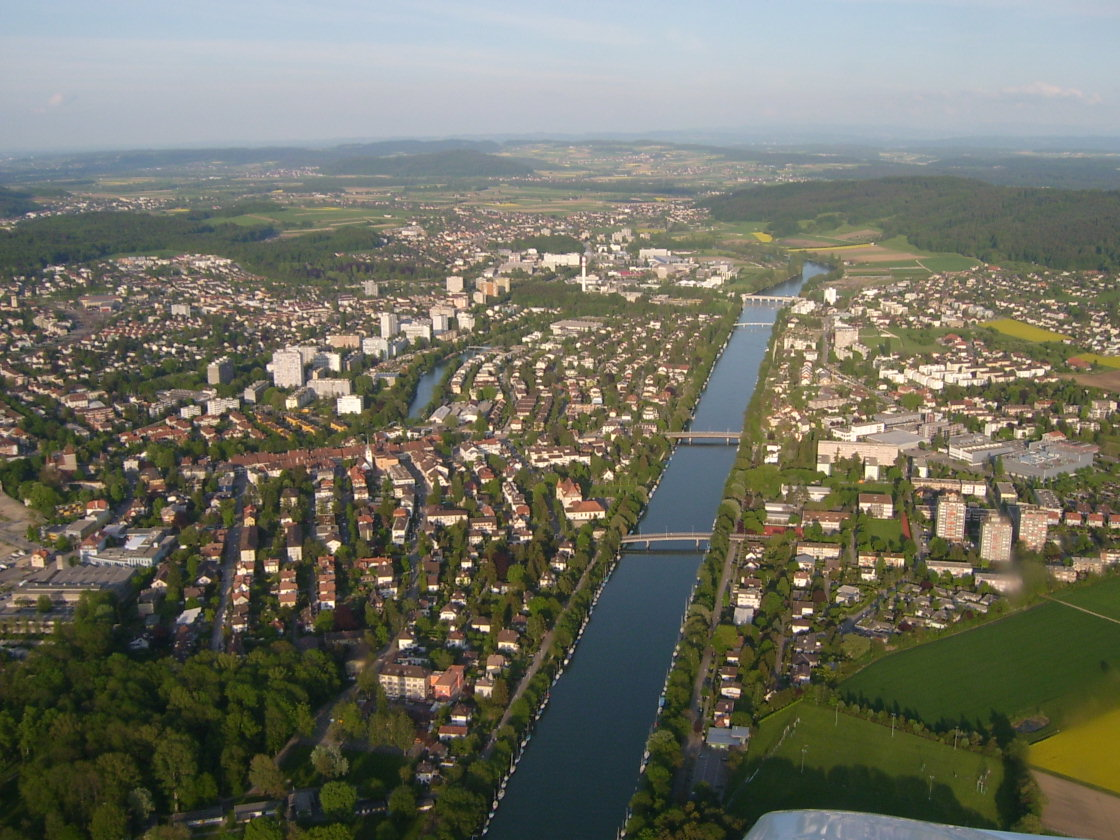
Aerial view of Nidau

Aerial view by Walter Mittelholzer (between 1918 and 1937)

The city is located at the city limits of Biel/Bienne and both cities have grown intertwined. Since the Jura water correction, the medieval centre and a good portion of the city of Nidau are now actually located on an island, created by the Nidau-Büren Aare canal, the river Thielle in French or Zihl in German, and the Lake Biel's shore.

Nidau has an area of 1.52 km^{2} (0.59 sq mi). As of 2012, none of the land is used for agricultural purposes, while 0.06 km^{2} (0.023 mi^{2}) or 3.9% is forested. Of the rest of the land, 1.28 km^{2} (0.49 mi^{2}) or 84.2% is settled (buildings or roads), 0.18 km^{2} (0.069 mi^{2}) or 11.8% is either rivers or lakes.

During the same year, industrial buildings made up 6.6% of the total area while housing and buildings made up 46.1% and transportation infrastructure made up 17.1%. Power and water infrastructure as well as other special developed areas made up 2.6% of the area while parks, green belts and sports fields made up 11.8%. Out of the forested land, 2.0% of the total land area is heavily forested and 2.0% is covered with orchards or small clusters of trees. Of the water in the municipality, 0.7% is in lakes and 11.2% is in rivers and streams.

On 31 December 2009 Amtsbezirk Nidau, the municipality's former district, was dissolved. On the following day, 1 January 2010, it joined the newly created Verwaltungskreis Biel/Bienne.

== Coat of arms ==
The blazon of the municipal coat of arms is Argent a Crayfish Gules and a Trout Azure dotted of the second.

== Demographics ==
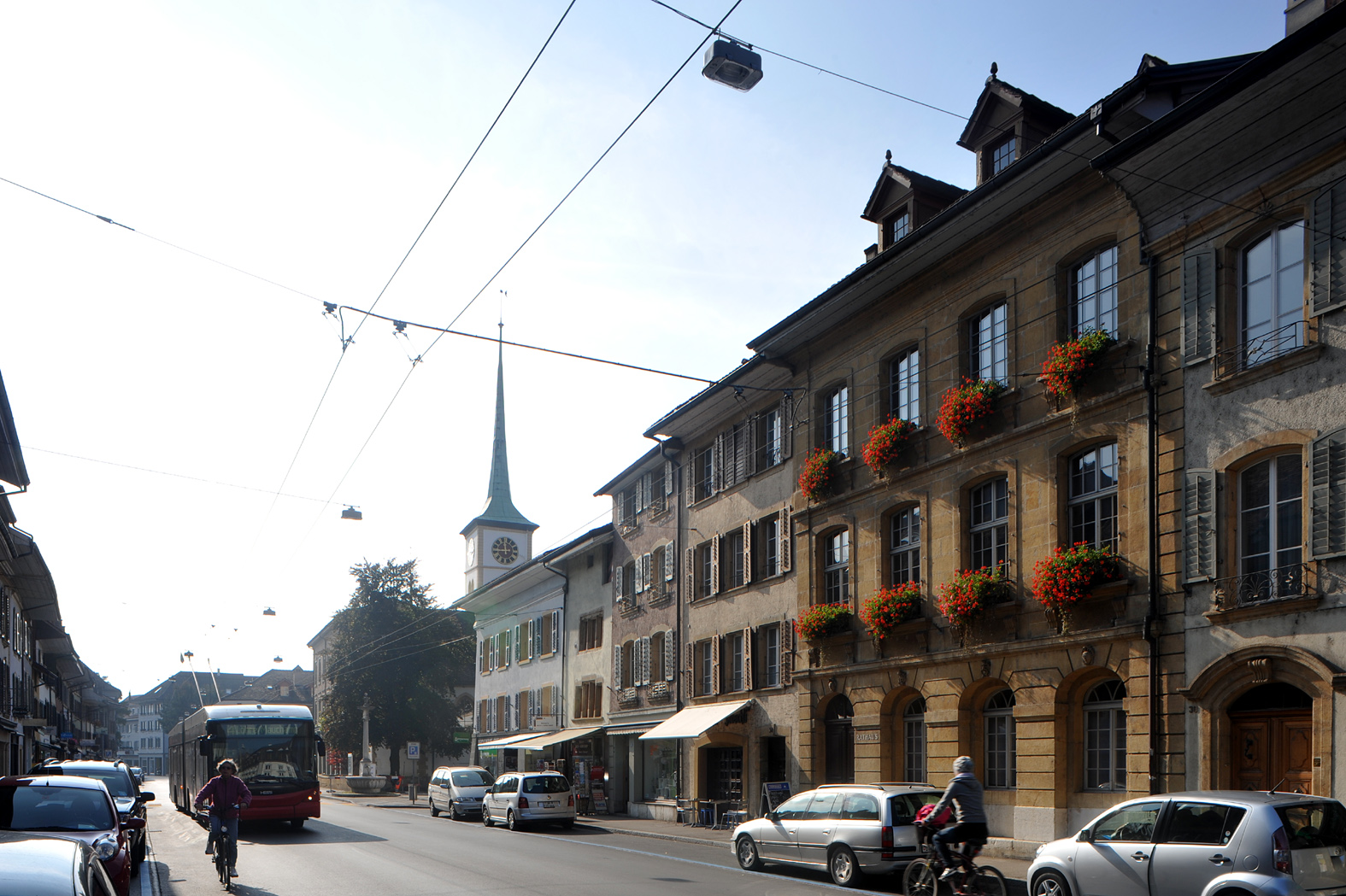
The Hauptstrasse (Main Street) in Nidau

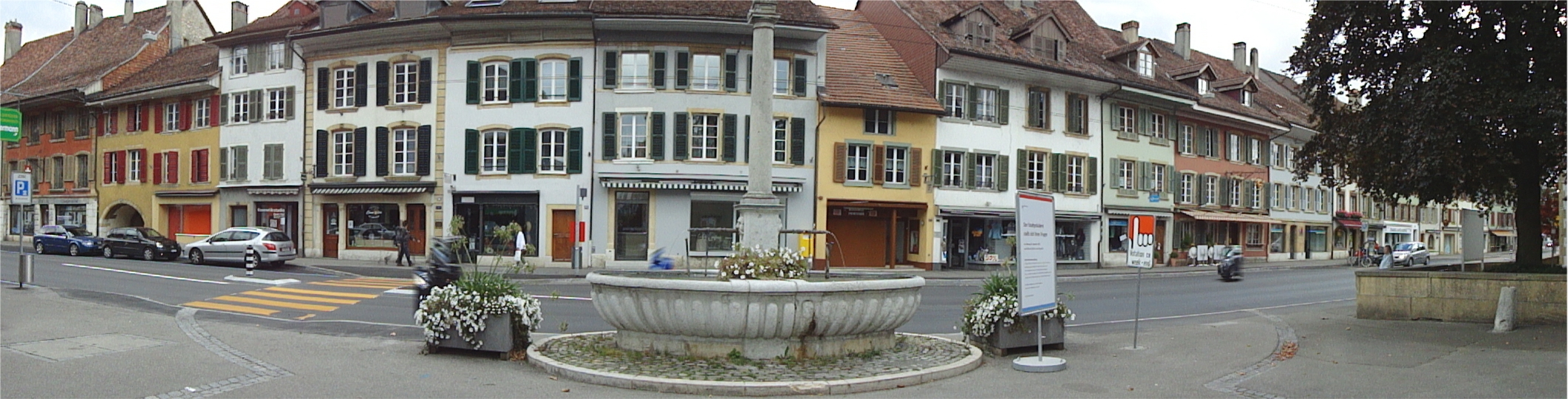
Old Town of Nidau

Nidau, located at the language boundary, although the official language is German, a high minority of French speakers live in the city, which has since long been offering them the right to send their children to the French-speaking schools of its sister city Biel/Bienne, the city of Nidau supporting the whole financial charge with its fiscal income.

Nidau has a population (as of December 2020) of 6,943. As of 2010, 20.8% of the population are resident foreign nationals. Over the last 10 years (2001-2011) the population has changed at a rate of 0.4%. Migration accounted for -0.1%, while births and deaths accounted for 0%.

Most of the population (as of 2000) speaks German (5,022 or 73.9%) as their first language, French is the second most common (1,071 or 15.8%) and Italian is the third (186 or 2.7%). There are 5 people who speak Romansh.

As of 2008, the population was 47.2% male and 52.8% female. The population was made up of 2,453 Swiss men (36.2% of the population) and 745 (11.0%) non-Swiss men. There were 2,921 Swiss women (43.1%) and 66 (1.0%) non-Swiss women. Of the population in the municipality, 1,147 or about 16.9% were born in Nidau and lived there in 2000. There were 2,730 or 40.2% who were born in the same canton, while 1,404 or 20.7% were born somewhere else in Switzerland, and 1,227 or 18.0% were born outside of Switzerland.

As of 2011, children and teenagers (0–19 years old) make up 18.2% of the population, while adults (20–64 years old) make up 58.6% and seniors (over 64 years old) make up 23.2%.

As of 2000, there were 2,473 people who were single and never married in the municipality. There were 3,240 married individuals, 549 widows or widowers and 536 individuals who are divorced.

As of 2010, there were 1,494 households that consist of only one person and 127 households with five or more people. In 2000, a total of 3,312 apartments (90.9% of the total) were permanently occupied, while 205 apartments (5.6%) were seasonally occupied and 128 apartments (3.5%) were empty. The vacancy rate for the municipality, in 2012, was 2.35%. In 2011, single family homes made up 43.4% of the total housing in the municipality.

The historical population is given in the following chart:

== Economy ==
As of 2011, Nidau had an unemployment rate of 3.28%. As of 2008, there were a total of 2,548 people employed in the municipality. Of these, there were no people employed in the primary economic sector. 962 people were employed in the secondary sector and there were 62 businesses in this sector. 1,586 people were employed in the tertiary sector, with 220 businesses in this sector. There were 3,434 residents of the municipality who were employed in some capacity, of which females made up 46.4% of the workforce.

In 2008 there were a total of 2,110 full-time equivalent jobs, of which none were in the primary sector. The number of jobs in the secondary sector was 903 of which 637 or (70.5%) were in manufacturing and 120 (13.3%) were in construction. The number of jobs in the tertiary sector was 1,207. In the tertiary sector; 326 or 27.0% were in wholesale or retail sales or the repair of motor vehicles, 23 or 1.9% were in the movement and storage of goods, 112 or 9.3% were in a hotel or restaurant, 32 or 2.7% were in the information industry, 33 or 2.7% were the insurance or financial industry, 247 or 20.5% were technical professionals or scientists, 106 or 8.8% were in education and 185 or 15.3% were in health care.

In 2000, there were 2,131 workers who commuted into the municipality and 2,732 workers who commuted away. The municipality is a net exporter of workers, with about 1.3 workers leaving the municipality for every one entering. A total of 701 workers (24.8% of the 2,832 total workers in the municipality) both lived and worked in Nidau. Of the working population, 27.3% used public transportation to get to work, and 42.9% used a private car.

In 2011 the average local and cantonal tax rate on a married resident, with two children, of Nidau making 150,000 CHF was 12.8%, while an unmarried resident's rate was 18.8%. For comparison, the rate for the entire canton in the same year, was 14.2% and 22.0%, while the nationwide rate was 12.3% and 21.1% respectively. In 2009 there were a total of 3,088 tax payers in the municipality. Of that total, 807 made over 75,000 CHF per year. There were 17 people who made between 15,000 and 20,000 per year. The greatest number of workers, 995, made between 50,000 and 75,000 CHF per year. The average income of the over 75,000 CHF group in Nidau was 116,929 CHF, while the average across all of Switzerland was 130,478 CHF.

In 2011 a total of 10.6% of the population received direct financial assistance from the government.

== Religion ==
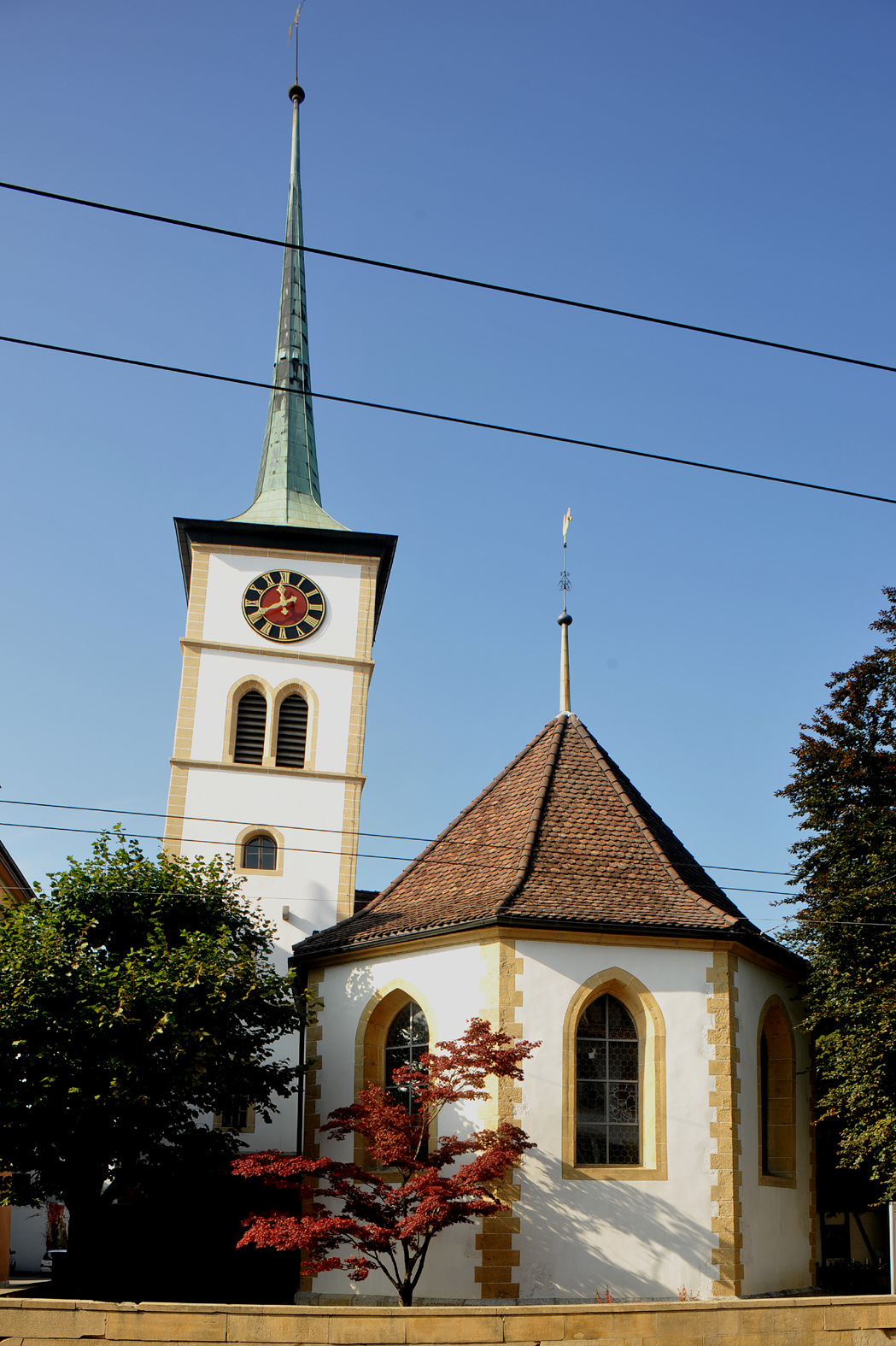
Church in Nidau

From the 2000 census, 3,637 or 53.5% belonged to the Swiss Reformed Church, while 1,503 or 22.1% were Roman Catholic. Of the rest of the population, there were 95 members of an Orthodox church (or about 1.40% of the population), there were 17 individuals (or about 0.25% of the population) who belonged to the Christian Catholic Church, and there were 168 individuals (or about 2.47% of the population) who belonged to another Christian church. There were 16 individuals (or about 0.24% of the population) who were Jewish, and 303 (or about 4.46% of the population) who were Islamic. There were 30 individuals who were Buddhist, 12 individuals who were Hindu and 6 individuals who belonged to another church. 745 (or about 10.96% of the population) belonged to no church, are agnostic or atheist, and 266 individuals (or about 3.91% of the population) did not answer the question.

== Education ==
In Nidau about 54.1% of the population have completed non-mandatory upper secondary education, and 17.4% have completed additional higher education (either university or a Fachhochschule). Of the 804 who had completed some form of tertiary schooling listed in the census, 60.1% were Swiss men, 26.1% were Swiss women, 8.1% were non-Swiss men and 5.7% were non-Swiss women.

The Canton of Bern school system provides one year of non-obligatory Kindergarten, followed by six years of Primary school. This is followed by three years of obligatory lower Secondary school where the students are separated according to ability and aptitude. Following the lower Secondary students may attend additional schooling or they may enter an apprenticeship.

During the 2011–12 school year, there were a total of 815 students attending classes in Nidau. There were 5 kindergarten classes with a total of 96 students in the municipality. Of the kindergarten students, 36.5% were permanent or temporary residents of Switzerland (not citizens) and 68.8% have a different mother language than the classroom language. The municipality had 16 primary classes and 291 students. Of the primary students, 29.9% were permanent or temporary residents of Switzerland (not citizens) and 46.4% have a different mother language than the classroom language. During the same year, there were 22 lower secondary classes with a total of 428 students. There were 15.4% who were permanent or temporary residents of Switzerland (not citizens) and 21.5% have a different mother language than the classroom language.

As of 2000, there were a total of 798 students attending any school in the municipality. Of those, 503 both lived and attended school in the municipality, while 295 students came from another municipality. During the same year, 278 residents attended schools outside the municipality.

Nidau is home to 2 libraries, the Bibliothèque de langue française and the Gemeindebibliothek Nidau. There was a combined total (as of 2008) of 19,158 books or other media in the libraries, and in the same year a total of 33,556 items were loaned out.

== Personalities ==
- Friedrich Fiala (1817–1888), bishop in the Bishopric of Basel was born in Nidau.
- Samuel Frisching 1605–1683, Schultheiss of the city and Republic Bern was also born in Nidau.
- Ulrich Ochsenbein (1811–1890), Federal Minister
- Georg Simon Ohm (1789–1854), physicist, taught at the monastery Gottstatt in office Nidau
- Eduard Müller (1848–1919), Federal Minister
- Hernan Ponce (1990–), Footballer, Goalkeeper

== Government ==
=== Legislative ===
Nidau's legislative is a city council, which consists of 30 members.

=== Executive ===
The executive council is formed with seven members:

- Sandra Hess, President
- Christian Bachman, Vice-President
- Marc Eyer
- Martin Fuhrer
- Florian Hitz
- Roland Lutz
- Dominik Weibel

(Status 2015)

== Politics ==
In the 2011 federal election the most popular party was the Social Democratic Party (SP) which received 25.6% of the vote. The next three most popular parties were the Swiss People's Party (SVP) (22%), the FDP.The Liberals (13.7%) and the Green Party (12.4%). In the federal election, a total of 1,873 votes were cast, and the voter turnout was 40.4%.

== Transportation ==
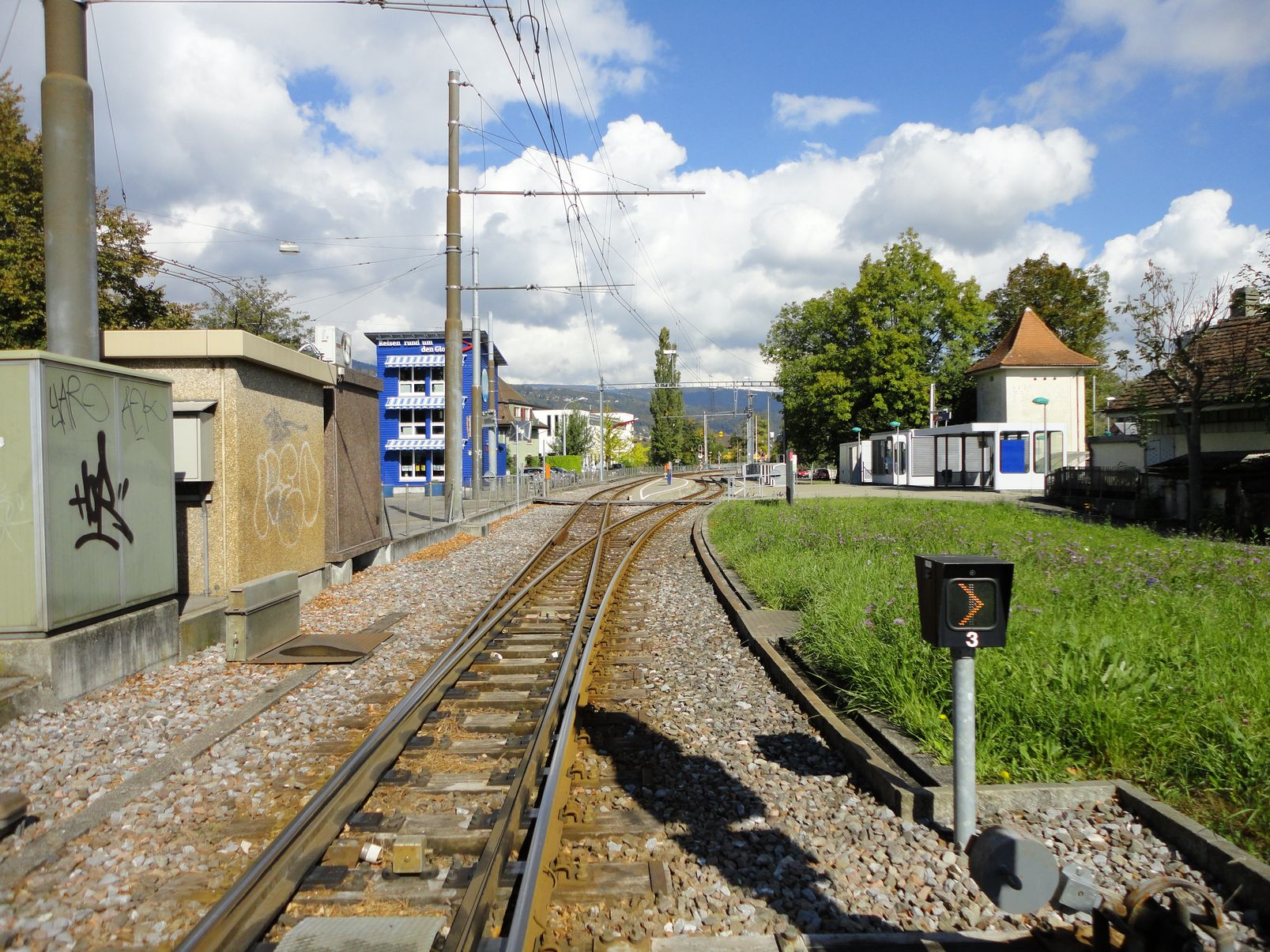
The small BTI train station in Nidau

Nidau is by public transport operates as follows:

Verkehrsbetriebe Biel (VB):

- Line 4 (trolley) Nidau - Biel / Löhr
- Line 7 (bus) Biel / gold mine - Brügg
- Line 8 (bus) Nidau - Port - Biel / fox Ried

PostBus Switzerland:

- Line 386 Biel - Aarberg
- Line 387 Biel - Jens

== Art, culture and sights ==
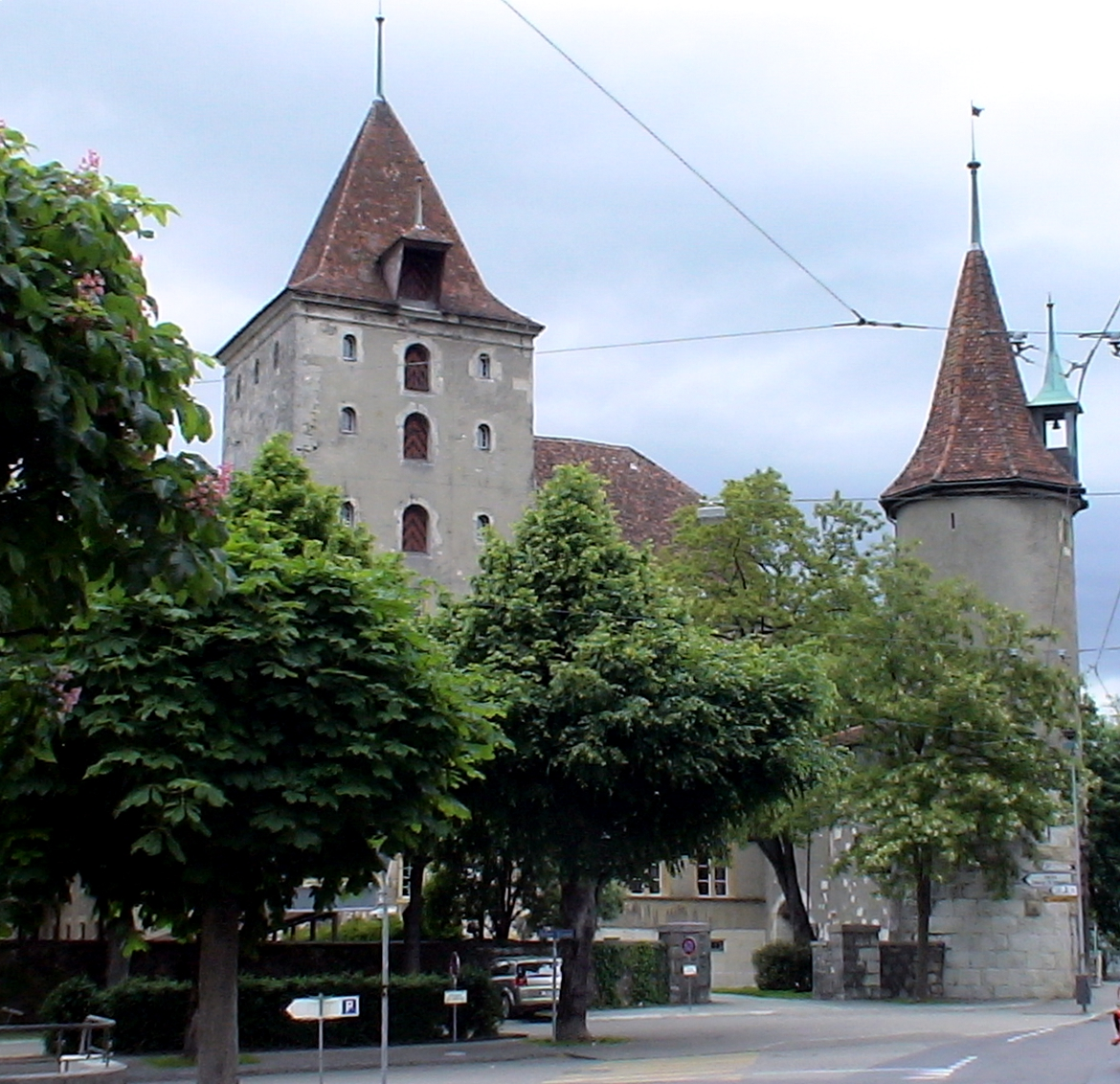
Nidau Castle

Nidau's landmark is Nidau Castle, in which all the offices of the cantonal administration (including the prefecture) and the Castle Museum. The museum has an interesting exhibit on the Jura water correction.

The first wooden castle on the site was built in 1140, followed by a second one in 1180. The presence of the Nidau castle is first evidenced by a deed dated 30 August 1196, issued by Count Ulrich III of Neuchâtel. The first stone castle was built in the early 13th century. It has a square building of about 11.2 m (37 ft) on each side with walls that were a maximum of 2.8 m (9.2 ft) thick. The main tower was about 40 m (130 ft) tall. The three round towers and the ring wall were probably built in the 13th century. It was surrounded by a moat and by the Zihl river. It was built by either Count Ulrich III or his son, Rudolf I of Nidau. The town of Nidau was founded south of the castle by 1338.

The last count of Nidau, Rudolf IV died in 1375 in a battle in the Gugler War. The next owner of the castle was the Prince-Bishop of Basel, Johann von Venningen. However, he was defeated in 1376 and the Counts of Kyburg acquired the castle. In 1379, Count Rudolf von Kyburg sold the castle and town to the Habsburgs. The Habsburgs then gave the castle as a fief to Enguerrand de Coucy, the former commander of the Guglers, in 1387. During the Sempach War, in May 1388, Swiss Confederation forces from Bern and Solothurn attacked and besieged the town and castle for seven weeks before taking Nidau. The castle was heavily damaged and the Swiss forces suffered heavy losses in the battle. Following the war, the town and castle were awarded to Bern in the peace settlement.

For the next four centuries it was the seat of the Nidau bailiwick. A new gatehouse was built in 1546. Several of the towers were rebuilt in 1587. During the 17th century a residential wing was added to the old main tower. Other ancillary buildings, stables, servants' apartments and a fountain were also added.

After the 1798 French invasion and the creation of the Helvetic Republic the old bailiwick was Nidau was dissolved. In 1803, the Act of Mediation created the district of Nidau and the castle became the seat of the Oberamtmann of the district. The moat was filled in and portions of the ring wall were demolished. With the Jura water correction projects of 1868, the water level in the river and Lake Biel dropped and the castle was no longer surrounded by water. During the 20th century the castle has been renovated and repaired several times.

=== Heritage sites of national significance ===
The Rathaus (Town council house), Nidau Castle and the beach along Lake Biel (Strandbad Biel) are listed as Swiss heritage site of national significance. The entire town of Nidau is part of the Inventory of Swiss Heritage Sites.

=== "Stedtlifescht" ===
Annually, on the last Saturday in May, the local Springtime festival "Stedtlifescht Nidau" takes place.

For this purpose the main road through Nidau is closed for any traffic. Over 120 market stalls line up on this day on each of the street of the medieval town. The young and old visitors come from nearby Biel and from all around the Seeland.

== Notable people ==
- Albert Trachsel (1863-1929) a Swiss painter, architect and writer
- Robert Roth (1898–1959)a Swiss wrestler who won a gold medal in the freestyle heavyweight class at the 1920 Summer Olympics

== International relations ==
Nidau maintains a partnership with the German municipality:

- (Germany) Schliengen in southern Baden-Württemberg
