= Marcel Junod =

Swiss medical doctor

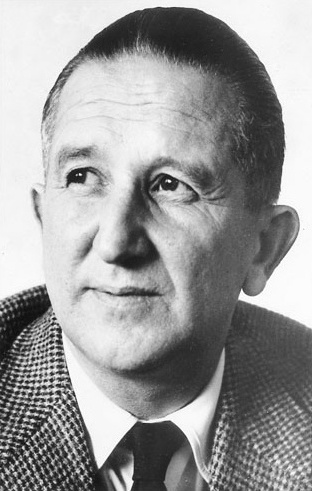
- Marcel Junod in 1952 (© Benoit Junod, Switzerland)
- Born: 14 May 1904; Neuchâtel, Switzerland
- Died: 16 June 1961 (aged 57); Geneva, Switzerland
- Known for: International Committee of the Red Cross

Marcel Junod (14 May 1904 – 16 June 1961) was a Swiss medical doctor and one of the most accomplished field delegates in the history of the International Committee of the Red Cross (ICRC). After medical school and a short position as a surgeon in Mulhouse, France, he became an ICRC delegate and was deployed in Ethiopia during the Second Italo-Abyssinian War, in Spain during the Spanish Civil War, and in Europe as well as in Japan during World War II. In 1947, he wrote a book with the title Warrior without Weapons about his experiences. After the war, he worked for the United Nations Children's Fund (UNICEF) as chief representative in China, and settled back in Europe in 1950. He founded the anaesthesiology department of the Cantonal Hospital in Geneva and became the first professor in this discipline at the University of Geneva. In 1952, he was appointed a member of the ICRC and, after many more missions for this institution, was Vice-President from 1959 until his death in 1961.

== Childhood and education ==
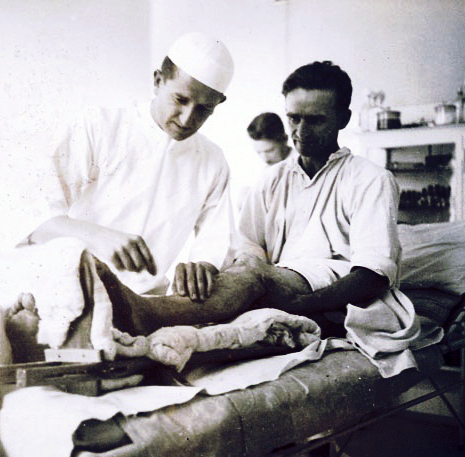
Marcel Junod as an intern in Mulhouse (©Benoit Junod, Switzerland)

Marcel Junod was born in Neuchâtel, Switzerland as the fifth of seven children, to Richard Samuel Junod (1868–1919) and Jeanne Marguerite Bonnet (1866–1952). His father was a pastor for the Independent Protestant Church of Neuchâtel, first working in mining villages in Belgium and later in poor communities near Neuchâtel and La Chaux-de-Fonds in Switzerland; the latter being where Junod spent most of his childhood. After the death of his father, his family returned to his mother's home of Geneva. In order to earn a living, his mother and aunt opened a boarding house.

Junod completed his initial education in 1923 with a baccalaureate diploma from Geneva's Collège Calvin, the same school that Red Cross founder Henry Dunant had attended. As a student, he volunteered in charity work and directed the Relief Movement for Russian Children in Geneva. Due to generous financial support from his uncle Henri-Alexandre Junod he was able to follow his aspirations and study medicine in Geneva and Strasbourg, obtaining his MD in 1929. He opted for special training in the field of surgery and interned at hospitals in Geneva and Mulhouse, France (1931–1935). He completed his training in Mulhouse in 1935, and began work as the head of the Mulhouse hospital's surgical clinic.

== Missions as an ICRC delegate ==
=== The Second Italo-Abyssinian War 1935/1936 ===
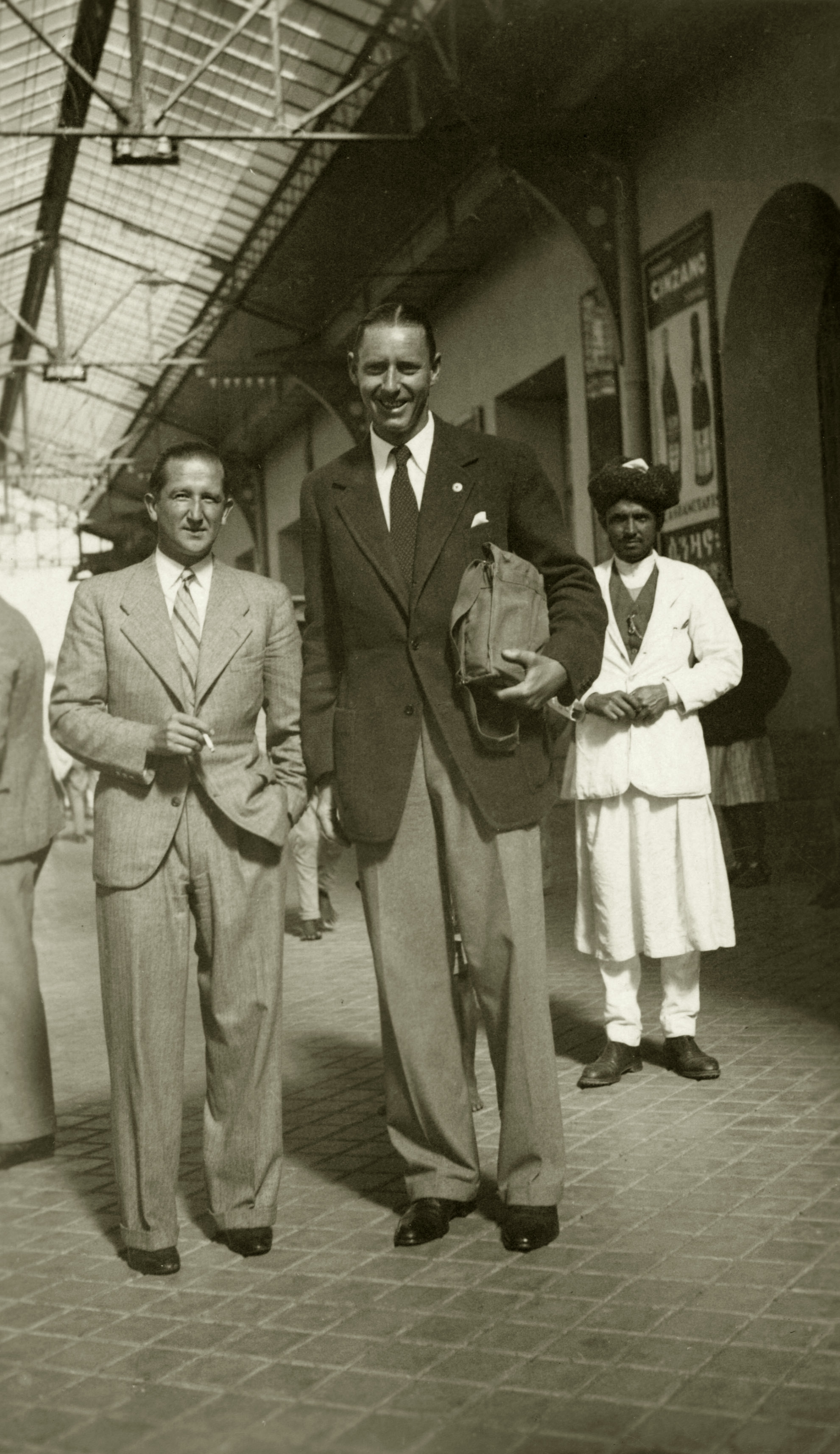
Marcel Junod with Sidney Brown in Addis Ababa (©Benoit Junod, Switzerland)

Immediately after the Italian invasion of Ethiopia, Junod received a call on 15 October 1935 from a friend in Geneva, recommending him to take a position as delegate for the International Committee of the Red Cross (ICRC) in Ethiopia. Encouraged by the head doctor of the clinic in Mulhouse, he accepted the offer and soon traveled to Addis Ababa with a second ICRC delegate, Sidney Brown. He would remain in Ethiopia until the end of the Abyssinian War in May 1936.

Because of his experience in law, Sidney Brown worked on the establishment of an effective national Red Cross Society in Ethiopia. Junod focused on the maintenance and coordination of Red Cross ambulances provided by the Red Cross societies of Egypt, Finland, the UK, the Netherlands, Norway and Sweden. While the Ethiopian Red Cross, having been founded only shortly before the outbreak of the war, accepted support from the ICRC and the League of Red Cross societies, the Italian Red Cross refused any cooperation, as Italy had not accepted the offer of services of the ICRC.

Some of the most difficult experiences for Junod during the war involved the attacks on Red Cross ambulances by the Italian military and Ethiopian armed groups. A bombing of a Swedish ambulance on 30 December 1935 killed 28 Red Cross workers and patients and wounded 50. He was also witness to a number of horrific episodes in this war characterized by the extreme gap in technological capabilities of the two sides. Among other events, he witnessed the bombardment of the city Dessie by the Italian Air Force, the use of mustard gas against civilian populations in the towns of Degehabur and Sassabaneh, and the plundering of Addis Ababa in the final days of the war.

. . . Men were stretched out everywhere beneath the trees. There must have been thousands of them. As I came closer, my heart in my mouth, I could see horrible suppurating burns on their feet and on their emaciated limbs. Life was already leaving bodies burned with mustard gas.

'Abiet . . . Abiet . . . .'

The monotonous chant rose towards the refuge of the Emperor. But who was to have pity? Who was to help them in their suffering? There were no doctors available and our ambulances had been destroyed. . . .

(Dr. Marcel Junod: Warrior without Weapons. ICRC, Geneva, 1982, p. 61)

=== The Spanish Civil War 1936-1939 ===
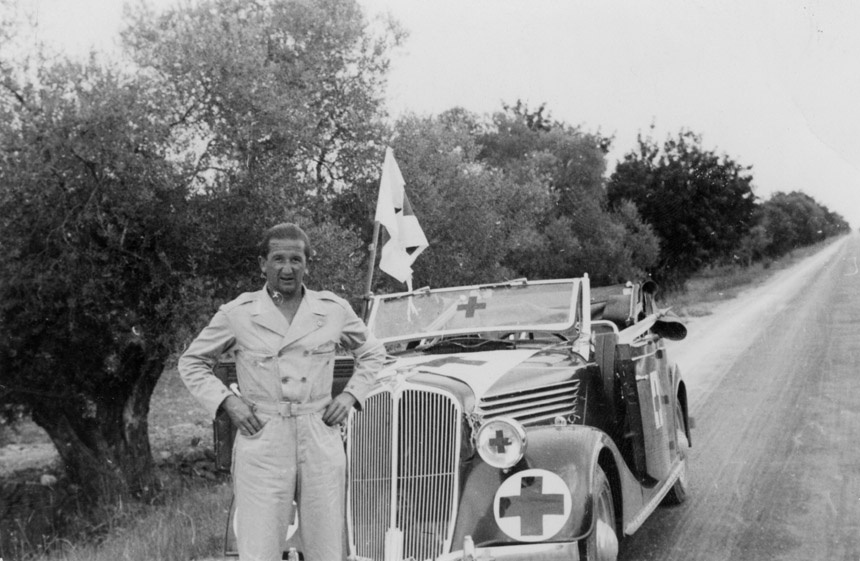
Marcel Junod during the Civil War in Spain (©Benoit Junod, Switzerland)

In July 1936 the ICRC sought a delegate for an investigation mission to Spain, where civil war had just broken out. Once again Junod was selected. Contrary to the ICRC's initial plan of a three-week deployment, he ultimately stayed for over three years, and the ICRC expanded the mission, led by Junod, to nine delegates spread across the country.

The activities of the Red Cross were hindered by the problem that the Geneva Conventions had no legal application to civil conflicts. As a solution, Junod suggested the creation of a new combined commission with representatives of the ICRC and of the warring sides, but the parties could not agree. The commission would have coordinated work on the release of captured women and children, the erection of neutral international zones, and the compilation of prisoner lists.

Despite the ambiguous legal basis for the Red Cross' work in this conflict, Junod succeeded to convince the warring parties to sign and implement a number of agreements regarding prisoner exchange and other issues, thereby saving many lives. Before the fall of Barcelona he achieved the release of five thousand prisoners whose lives were endangered by fighting for the city. He also organized research and information exchange regarding prisoners and missing persons using the Red Cross card system for the first time in the context of civil conflict, and by the end of the war the ICRC had facilitated the exchange of five million cards.

. . . Someone was on the other side of the line and his nearest did not even know whether he was alive or dead.

For a long time I had realized that this uncertainty was the greatest agony of all. I had seen too many trembling hand stretched out for the sheet of paper that we had at last succeeded in getting from one side to the other: the Red Cross card.

There was not much on it: a name and address and a message which was not allowed to exceed twenty-five words. Often when it came back the censor had left only the signature on it, but at least it was proof that a loved one was still alive. And then the eyes which read the name and the signature would fill with tears of joy. . . .

(Dr. Marcel Junod: Warrior without Weapons ICRC, Geneva, 1982, p. 115)

=== The Second World War 1939-1945 ===
After the outbreak of World War II, Junod was called to Geneva by a letter from the ICRC and was once again made an ICRC delegate, releasing him from his obligations as a medical officer for the Swiss Army. He started his mission on 16 September 1939 in Berlin and for a long time remained the only ICRC delegate in Germany and its soon-to-be occupied territories. Only eleven days later, on 27 September, he visited a camp with Polish prisoners of war. In June 1940 he succeeded in preventing a series of threatened executions of French POWs, which had been planned as retaliation for the falsely assumed execution of German paratroopers. Once again he organized the forwarding and exchange of information relating to POWs, this time with the support of the ICRC central office for POWs in Geneva.

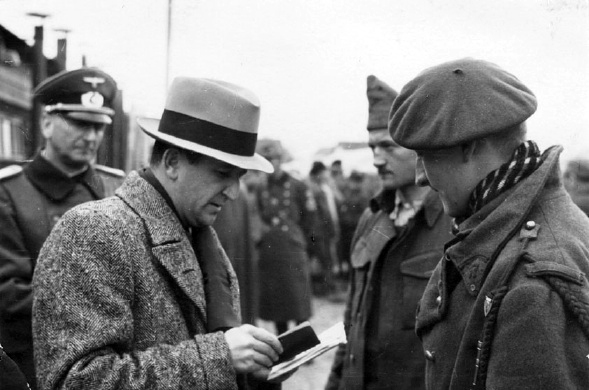
Marcel Junod visiting POWs in Germany (©Benoit Junod, Switzerland)

The central tasks in this war were the observation of the adherence to the Geneva Conventions in POW camps and the distribution of provisions and medical supplies to the civil populations of occupied territories. Yet the civil population effort was not part of the legally defined role of the ICRC and would not be so until the 1949 Fourth Geneva Convention. To provide logistical support for these efforts, Junod worked to introduce the first use of Red Cross ships, specially marked with the neutral symbols of the ICRC, to provide needed goods and supplies. For example, a number of ships were provided by Belgium ("Caritas I", "Caritas II" and "Henri Dunant"), Turkey ("Kurtulus", "Dumlupinar"), and Sweden ("Hallaren", "Sturebog"). Sadly, on 9 June 1942, despite its neutral markings, the "Sturebog" was sunk by an Italian aircraft.

. . . For three weeks we impatiently awaited news that the Sturebog had arrived back safely in Alexandria. Geneva inquired vainly after her whereabouts in London, Rome, Berlin and Ankara. The Sturebog was lost at sea and we began to think that we should never learn anything about her fate.

. . . Then one morning on the coast of Palestine two Bedouins going along the shore found a body half buried in the sand. . . . He was the sole survivor of the Sturebog, a Portuguese sailor. Gradually he recovered and after a week he was able to tell his tale.

The day after the departure of the Sturebog from Piraeus two Italian planes flew overhead. They flew round in circles and had plenty of time to observe the huge red crosses painted on the ship's white side. Nevertheless they dropped a bomb which cut the Sturebog in half. . . .

(Dr. Marcel Junod: Warrior without Weapons ICRC, Geneva, 1982, p. 202)

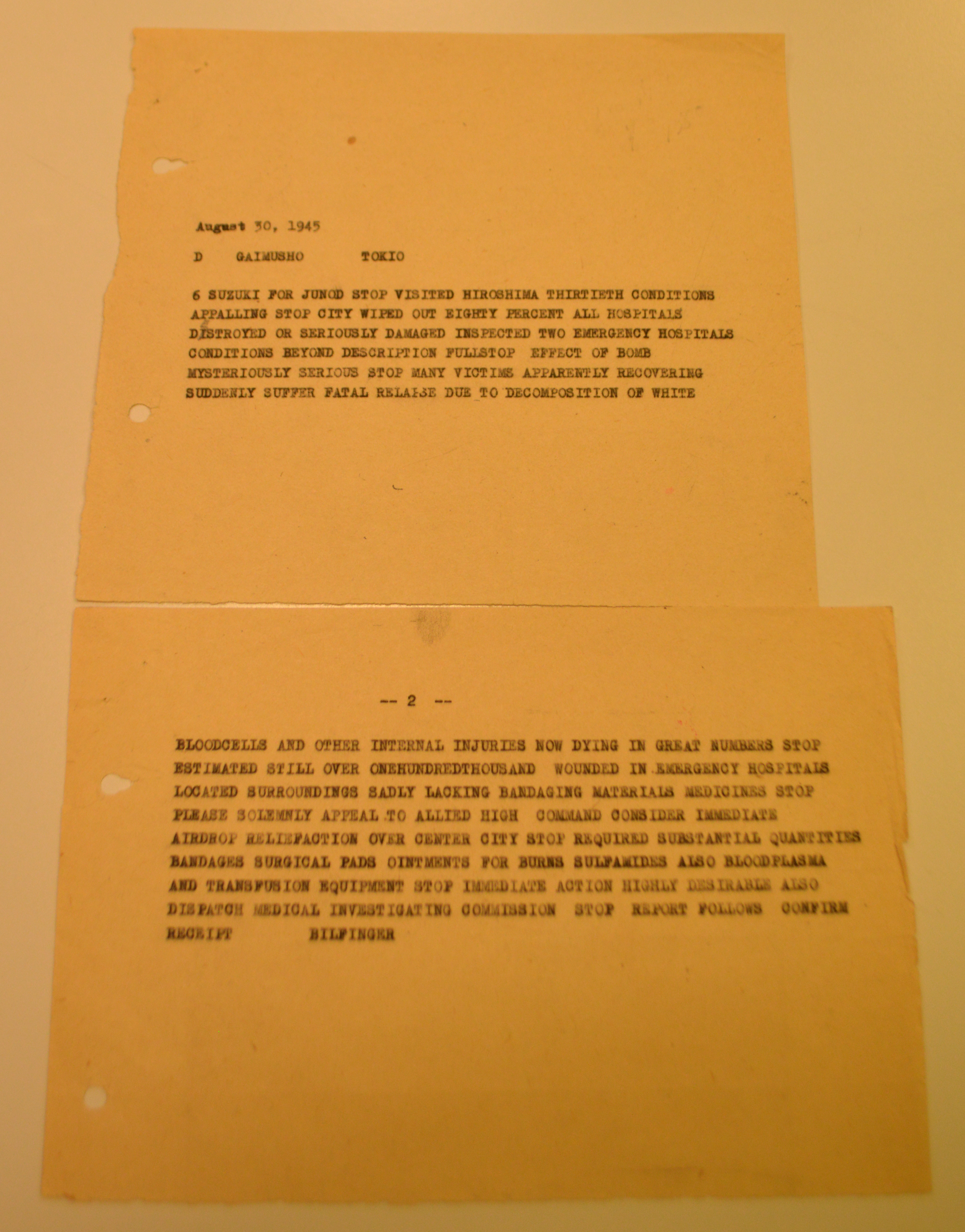
Telegram sent by ICRC delegate Fritz Bilfinger on 30 August 1945 from Hiroshima to Junod

The ICRC has been criticized for ignoring the Jewish Holocaust, of which it became aware in 1942 (see that page). Despite extensive visits to prison camps, meeting Hans Frank and being aware of "millions of prisoners" at "Buchenwald and Dachau," and "Belsen, Mauthausen and others we were still unaware of," Junod's memoir makes no mention of the Jews.

In December 1944, Junod married his wife Eugénie Georgette Perret (1915-1970). After a short break from being a delegate, during part of which he worked in the ICRC headquarters in Geneva, in June 1945 he was sent to Japan and arrived in Tokyo on 9 August. His original mission involved the visit of POWs in Japanese camps and the supervision of the adherence to the Geneva Conventions in Japanese territory. His mission in Japan took place while his wife was expecting a child at home. After the American dropping of atomic bombs on Hiroshima (6 August 1945) and Nagasaki (9 August 1945) and the subsequent Japanese surrender, Junod organized the evacuation of POW camps and the Allied rescue of the often severely injured inmates. On 30 August he received photographic evidence and a telegraph description of the conditions in Hiroshima. He quickly organized an assistance mission and on 8 September became the first foreign doctor to reach the site. He was accompanied by an American investigation task force, two Japanese doctors, and 15 tons of medical supplies. He stayed there for five days, during which he visited all of the major hospitals, administered the distribution of supplies, and personally gave medical care. The photographs from Hiroshima, which he gave to the ICRC, were some of the first pictures of the city after the explosion to reach Europe.

. . . On what remained of the station facade the hands of the clock had been stopped by the fire at 8.15.

It was perhaps the first time in the history of humanity that the birth of a new era was recorded on the face of a clock. . . .

(Dr. Marcel Junod: Warrior without Weapons ICRC, Geneva, 1982, p. 300)

== His life after the Second World War ==
His deployment in Japan and other surrounding Asian countries lasted until April 1946 when he was able to return to Switzerland, having missed the birth of his son Benoit in October 1945. After he returned, he wrote the book Le Troisième Combattant, entitled in English, Warrior Without Weapons. It describes, in very personal language, his experiences during his various ICRC deployments. Other editions were published in German, in Spanish, Danish, Swedish, Dutch, Japanese and Serbo-Croatian. An Italian translation of the book appeared in 2006, nearly 60 years later. It has been reprinted several times by the International Committee of the Red Cross in English, French and Spanish. The book is sometimes called the "bedside volume of all young ICRC delegates."

Thus it is our task to form a third front above and cutting across the two belligerent fronts, a third front which is directed against neither of them, but which works for the benefit of both. The combatants of this third front are interested only in the suffering of the defenceless human being, irrespective of his nationality, his convictions or his past. They fight wherever they can against all inhumanity, against every degradation of the human personality, against all injustice directed against defenceless human beings. It is for these fighters that Dr. Junod has coined the expression 'the third combatant'.

(Dr. Marcel Junod: Warriors without Weapons. From the foreword by Max Huber, former ICRC President)

From January 1948 until April 1949, Junod was active as a representative of the UN children's help organization, UNICEF, in China, after being invited for that position by then UNICEF director Maurice Pate. However, due to an illness that made it difficult to stand for long periods of time, he had to cut off his deployment. He also had to turn down a mission for the World Health Organization (WHO) and was forced to give up his career as a surgeon. He decided to become a specialist in anesthesiology, which would allow him to work sitting down. The need for additional training and education led him to Paris and London, and in 1951 he returned to Geneva and opened a new practice. For the first time since his time at the hospital in Mulhouse, he began regular work once again as a doctor. In 1953, he convinced the management of the Cantonal Hospital of Geneva to open an anesthesiology department, of which he later became the director. He was also able to finally devote himself to medical research, which he presented in numerous journals and at conferences.

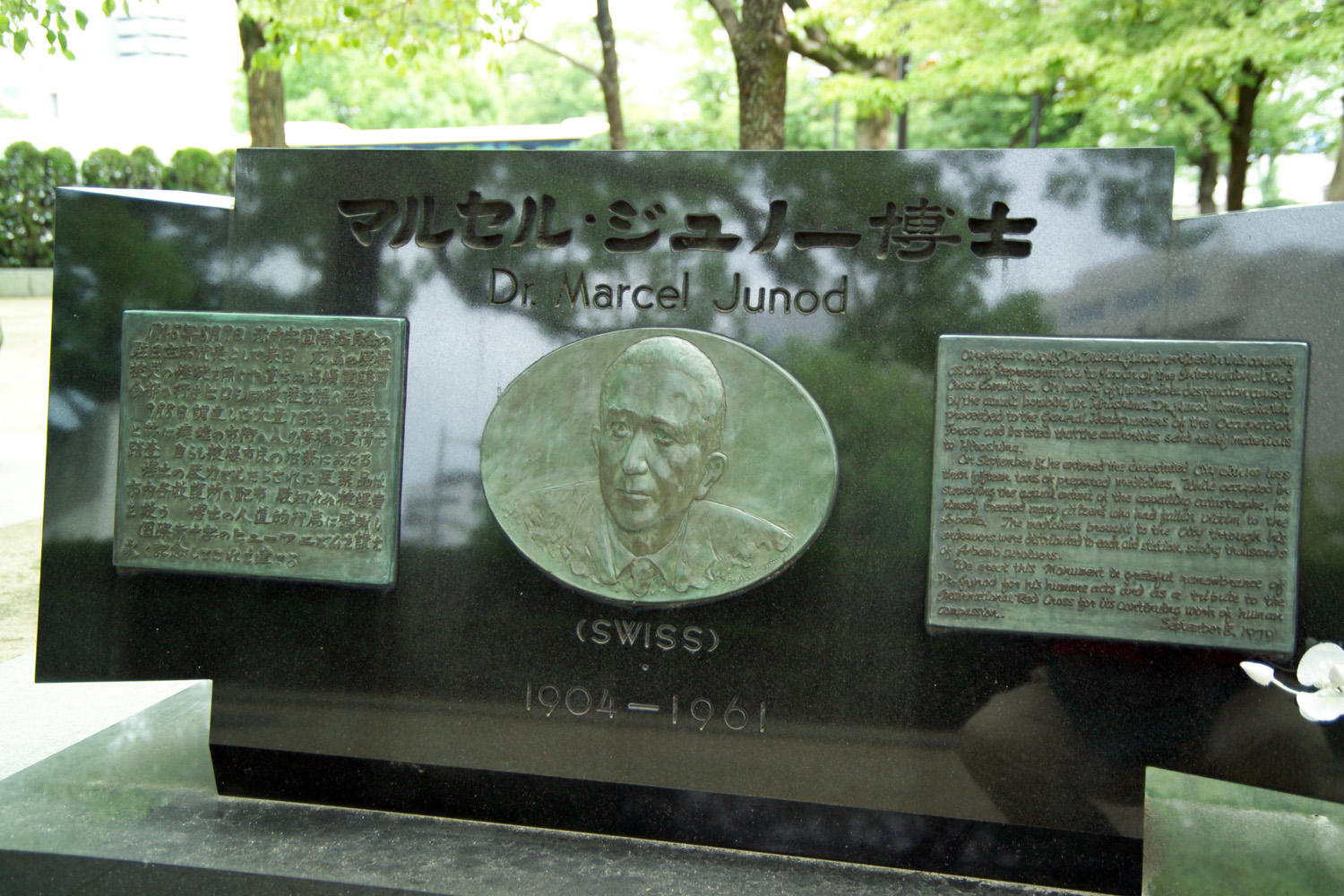
Monument to Marcel Junod in the Hiroshima Memorial Peace Park

In 1946, the USA wanted to honour Junod with the Medal of Liberty for his work on behalf of Allied prisoners in Japan, but a rule that Swiss citizens, while bound to military service, cannot accept foreign decorations, prevented him from receiving it. Four years later in 1950, he received the Gold Medal for Peace of Prince Carl of Sweden for his extensive humanitarian service. He was appointed a member of the ICRC on 23 October 1952 and elected vice-president in 1959. At the beginning of 1953, he relocated to Lullier, a small, charming village near Geneva, to find respite from his double burden as a physician and member of the ICRC. He spent almost all of his holidays with friends in Barcelona whom he knew from his mission in Spain. His positions in the ICRC sent him to Budapest, Vienna, Cairo, and elsewhere. In 1957 he attended the International Red Cross Conference in New Delhi, and in 1960 he visited national Red Cross societies in the Soviet Union, Taiwan, Thailand, Hong Kong, South Korea, Japan, Canada, and the United States. In December 1960 he was appointed Professor of Anesthesiology in the Faculty of Medicine at the University of Geneva.

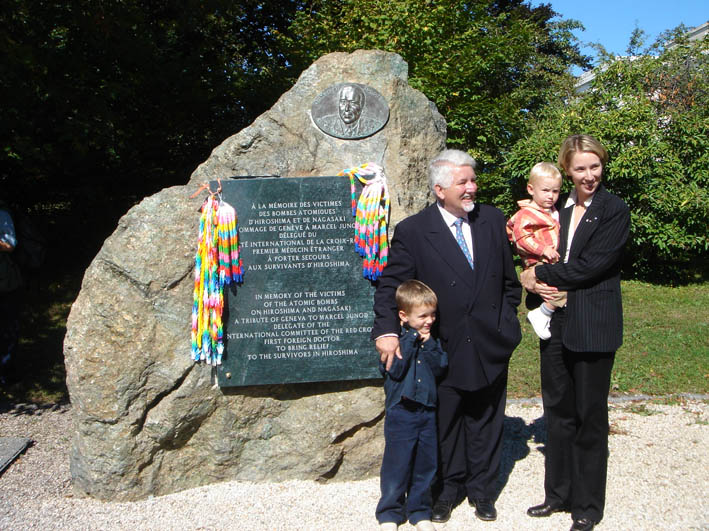
Benoit Junod, the son of Dr. Junod, with his family in front of the monument in Geneva (©Benoit Junod, Switzerland)

Marcel Junod died on 16 June 1961 in Geneva from a massive heart attack while working as an anesthesiologist in an operation. The ICRC received more than 3,000 letters and other messages of condolence from all over the world. In the same year, he was posthumously awarded the Order of the Sacred Treasure by the government of Japan. On 8 September 1979 a monument to Junod was inaugurated in the Hiroshima Peace Park. Each year on the anniversary of his death a commemorative meeting is held in front of the monument. On 13 September 2005, 60 years after he left Hiroshima, a similar monument was inaugurated in Geneva by the town and cantonal authorities.

The last sentence of the following quotation from the final chapter of Junod's book is written on the back of the Hiroshima monument:

. . . All these pictures are not merely out of the past. They are still with us all today and they will be with us still more tomorrow. Those wounded men and those pitiful captives are not things in a nightmare; they are near us now. Their fate is in our care. Let us place no reliance on the slender hope which lawyers have aroused by devising a form of words to place a check on violence. There will never be too many volunteers to answer so many cries of pain, to answer so many half-stifled appeals from the depths of prison and prison camp.

Those who call for help are many. It is you they are calling.

(Dr. Marcel Junod: Warrior without Weapons ICRC, Geneva, 1982, p. 312)
