= Trachsel =

Trachsel is a surname. Notable people with the surname include:

- Albert Trachsel (1863–1929), Swiss painter, architect, and writer
- Daniel Trachsel, a Swiss chemist
- Hansjörg Trachsel (born 1948), Swiss politician and bobsledder
- Jamie Trachsel (born 1979), American softball coach
- Steve Trachsel (born 1970), American baseball player
