= Nidau Castle =

Castle in Nidau, Bern, Switzerland

- Schloss Nidau
- Nidau
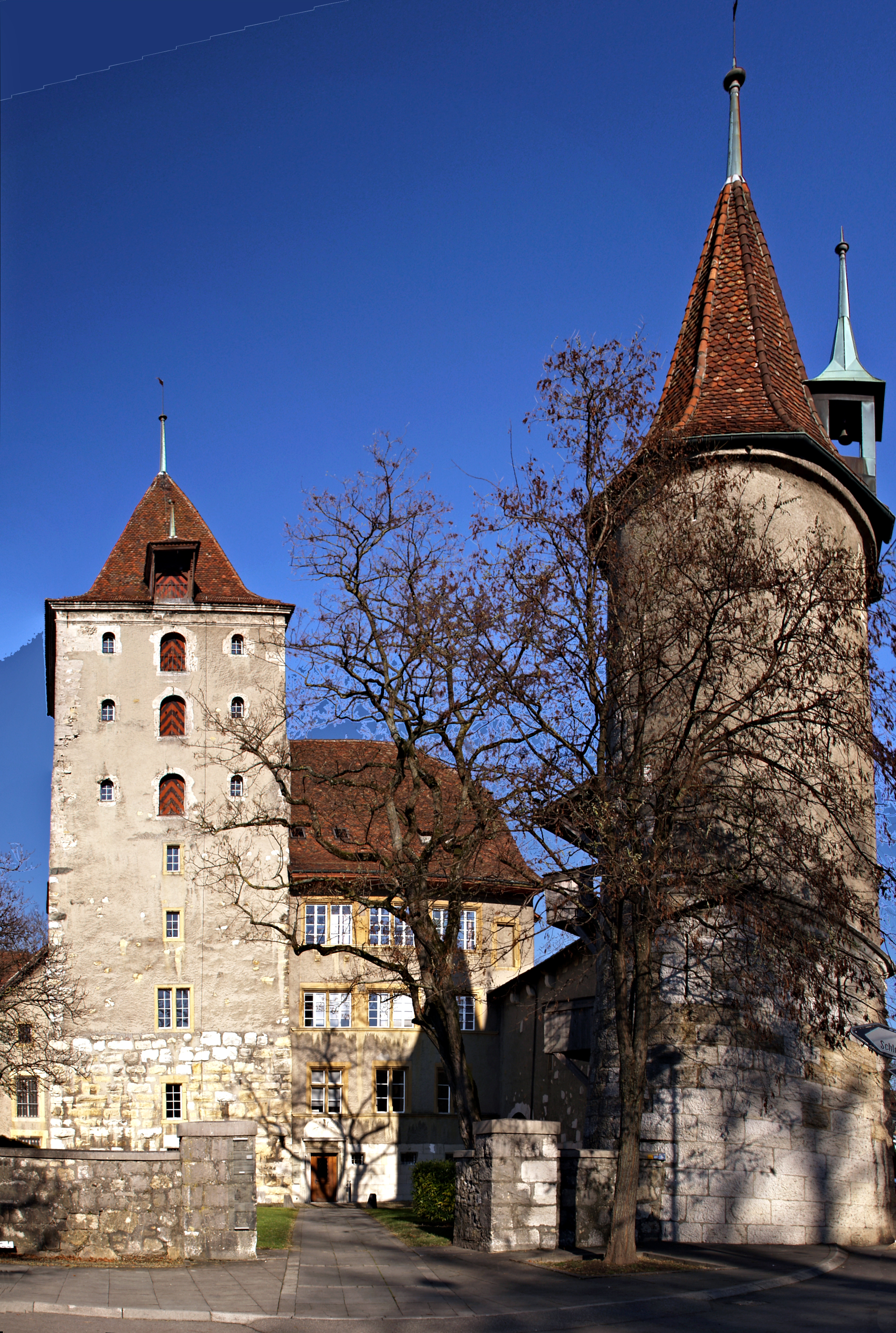
- Nidau Castle

Site information
- Owner: Canton of Bern
- Open to the public: yes

Location
- Coordinates: 47.12778°N 7.240195°E

Site history
- Built: 13th century
- Built by: Ulrich III or Rudolf I of Nidau
- Materials: Limestone

Nidau Castle is a castle in the municipality of Nidau of the Canton of Bern in Switzerland. It is a Swiss heritage site of national significance.

== History ==
Nidau's landmark is Nidau Castle, in which all the offices of the cantonal administration (including the prefecture) and the Castle Museum. The museum has an interesting exhibit on the Jura water correction.

The first wooden castle on the site was built in 1140, followed by a second one in 1180. The presence of the Nidau castle is first evidenced by a deed dated 30 August 1196, issued by Count Ulrich III of Neuchâtel. The first stone castle was built in the early 13th century. It has a square building of about 11.2 m (37 ft) on each side with walls that were a maximum of 2.8 m (9.2 ft) thick. The main tower was about 40 m (130 ft) tall. The three round towers and the ring wall were probably built in the 13th century. It was surrounded by a moat and by the Zihl river. It was built by either Count Ulrich III or his son, Rudolf I of Nidau. The town of Nidau was founded south of the castle by 1338.

The last count of Nidau, Rudolf IV died in 1375 in a battle in the Gugler War. The next owner of the castle was the Prince-Bishop of Basel, Johann von Venningen. However, he was defeated in 1376 and the Counts of Kyburg acquired the castle. In 1379, Count Rudolf von Kyburg sold the castle and town to the Habsburgs. The Habsburgs then gave the castle as a fief to Enguerrand de Coucy, the former commander of the Guglers, in 1387. During the Sempach War, in May 1388, Swiss Confederation forces from Bern and Solothurn attacked and besieged the town and castle for seven weeks before taking Nidau. The castle was heavily damaged and the Swiss forces suffered heavy losses in the battle. Following the war, the town and castle were awarded to Bern in the peace settlement.

For the next four centuries it was the seat of the Nidau bailiwick. A new gatehouse was built in 1546. Several of the towers were rebuilt in 1587. During the 17th century a residential wing was added to the old main tower. Other ancillary buildings, stables, servants' apartments and a fountain were also added.

After the 1798 French invasion and the creation of the Helvetic Republic the old bailiwick was Nidau was dissolved. In 1803, the Act of Mediation created the district of Nidau and the castle became the seat of the Oberamtmann of the district. The moat was filled in and portions of the ring wall were demolished. With the Jura water correction projects of 1868, the water level in the river and Lake Biel dropped and the castle was no longer surrounded by water. During the 20th century the castle has been renovated and repaired several times.

== See also ==
- List of castles in Switzerland
