= Albert Trachsel =

Swiss painter

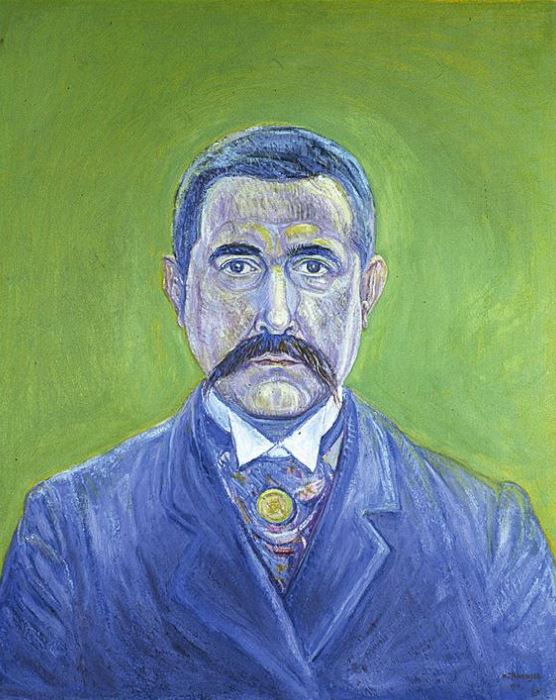
Self-portrait (1911)

Albert Trachsel (23 December 1863, Nidau – 26 January 1929, Geneva) was a Swiss painter, architect and writer.

== Biography ==
His parents moved to Geneva while he was still a toddler. He began his artistic education by studying architecture at the École des Beaux-Arts in Geneva then, in 1881, continued at the Polytechnikum Zürich and completed his studies in Paris in 1882. He displayed some of his first architectural designs in 1885. While in Paris, he met Paul Gauguin, Stéphane Mallarmé, Paul Verlaine und Jean Moréas. He also became lifelong friends with Ferdinand Hodler. In 1890, he submitted designs for the proposed Palais de Rumine.

He had his first solo display of drawings in 1891 at the Société des Artistes Indépendants. An article about him by Stuart Merrill appeared in 1893 in La Plume, a Symbolist journal. That same year, he published some imaginary architectural designs, accompanied by poetry, under the title Les fêtes réelles (The Real Feasts), which was intended to be the first volume of a trilogy called Poetry. This was followed by Le Cycle; the beginning of another uncompleted trilogy called Harmony.

In 1901 he went back to Geneva and, with none of his designs realized, turned to painting instead. He travelled throughout Switzerland in 1903, creating watercolors. From 1905 to 1914, he painted a series of fantastic illustrated tales called Paysages de rêve ("dream landscapes") which constitute his major work. After 1910, he also did still-lifes with flowers and fruit. After 1915, he devoted himself entirely to watercolors depicting the areas around Geneva.

In addition to the above writings, he authored a play; Le Gnome Hombax chez les sorcières (Hombax the Gnome and the Sorcerers), and a novella; La Montagne fantastique (The Fantastic Mountain).

== Selected paintings ==
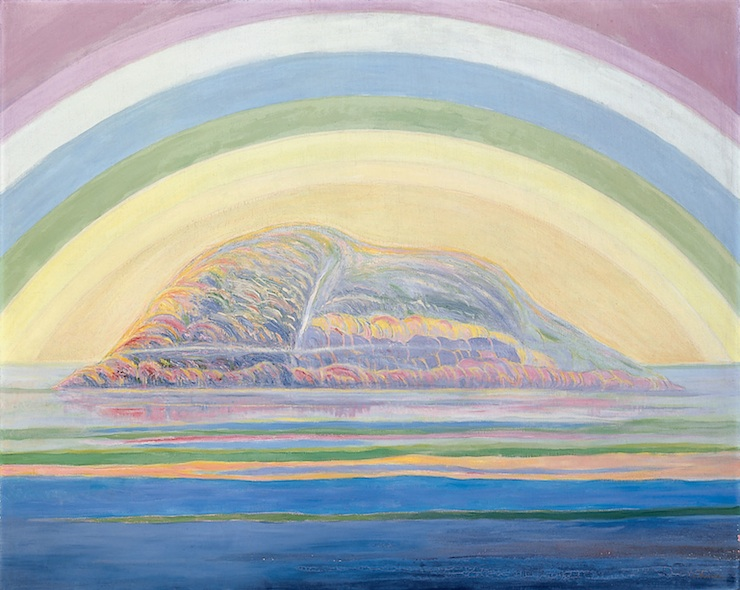
Island of the Flowering Trees

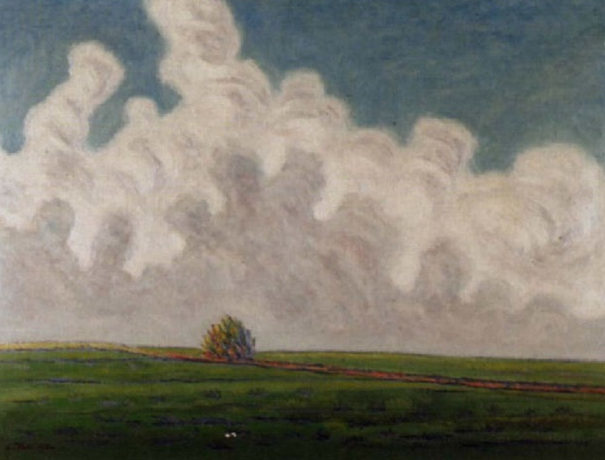
Landscape near Lullier

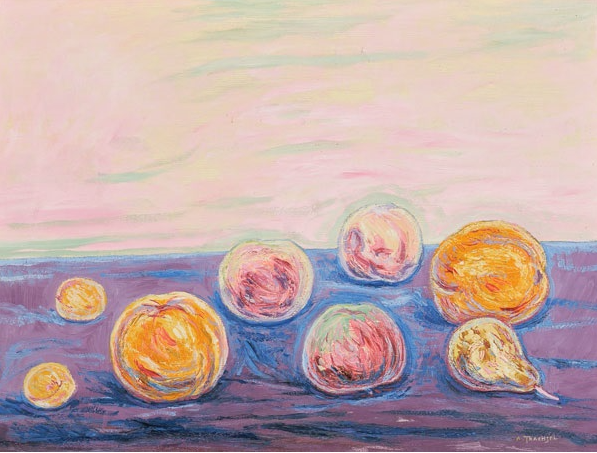
Still-life with Fruit

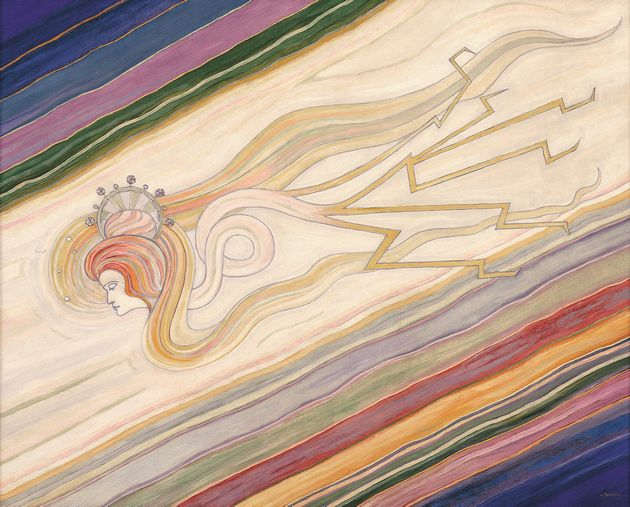
Lightning
