= Altreu =

Village in Lebern District, Switzerland

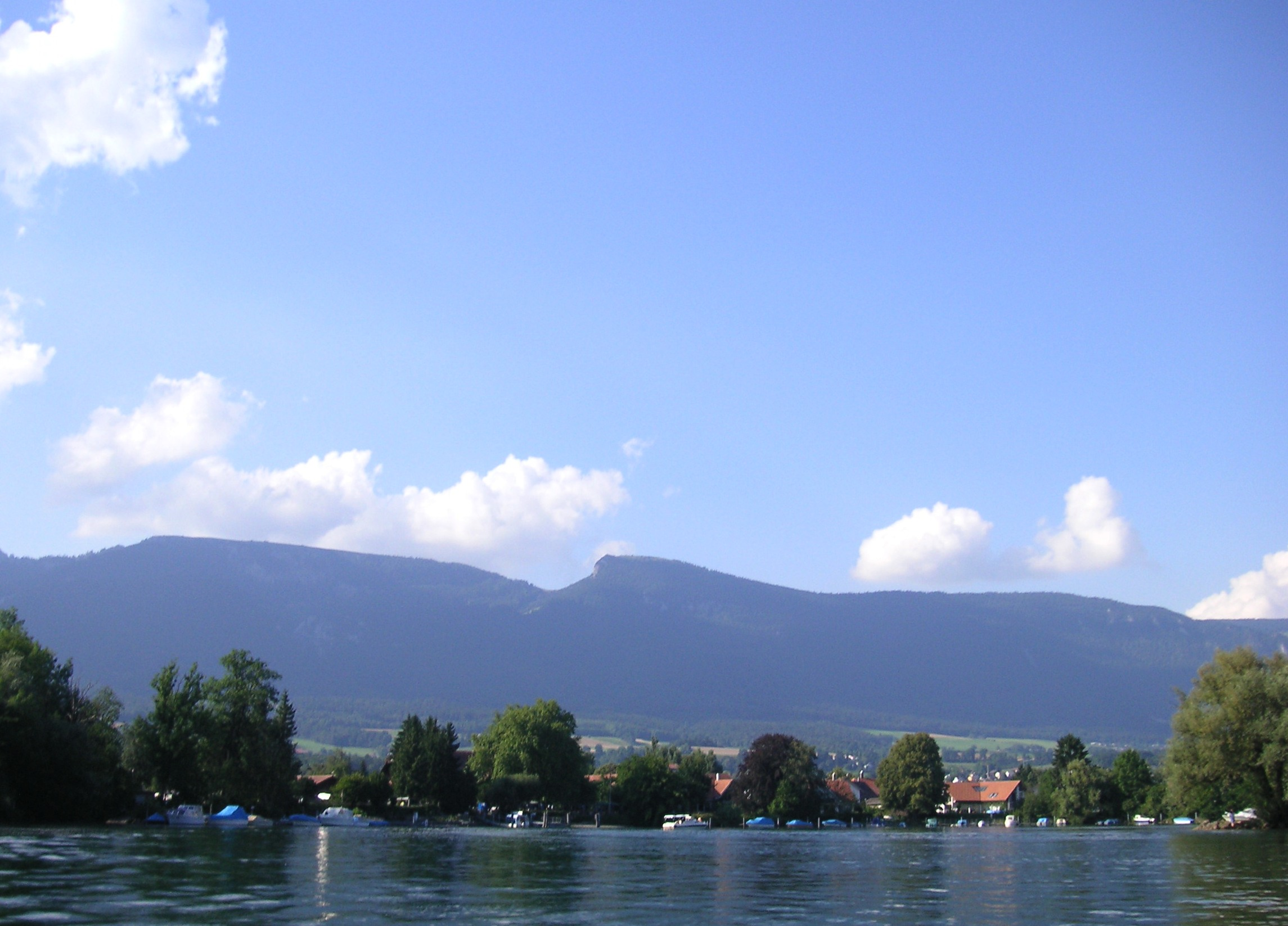
Altreu, with Hasenmatt in the background

Altreu is a village in the municipality of Selzach in Canton of Solothurn's Lebern District, Switzerland.

== Geography ==
Aerial view (1955)

Altreu lies 429 m above sea level, 7 km west-southwest of the canton's capital Solothurn. The village stands along the north bank of the Aare and at the meeting point of the two streams Haagbach and Selzacherbach, shortly before they flow into the Aare. The village is located in a nearly 3 km-wide lowland of the Aare in the west of Solothurn's part of the Swiss Plateau.

== Recreation ==
Altreu is a stop for hikers and bicyclists along the meandering course of the Aare. Altreu is known internationally for its white stork colony, which was established by conservationist Max Blösch in 1948; the 15 km^{2} 'Witi' reserve serves as a hunting ground and resting place for the storks in the marshlands of the Aare. In 2008, Altreu was recognized as a European stork village by the EuroNatur foundation.

== Transportation ==
The village lies away from major thoroughfares but is easy to reach from nearby Selzach. Altreu is connected by bus to Grenchen's train station. The Selzach train station on the Solothurn-Biel line is approximately 1 km from the village center. The Leuzigen-Altreu ferry carries passengers across the Aare, and Altreu is also a stop for the passenger ship between Biel and Solothurn.

== History ==
A Roman fort once stood in the area of Altreu, along with a bridge which connected the Roman roads north of the Aare with the main road to the south between Aventicum and Salodurum (Solothurn).

The first recorded mention of the town appeared in 1280 as Altrua; from 1330 the name appears as Altrüwe. At around 1260, the Neuenburg-Strassberg noble family established the medieval town of Altreu, which was fortified with walls, trenches, and a castle; a wooden bridge over the Aare was also constructed at that time. The region north of the Aare which separated from the Strassberg Herrschaft in 1309 was named after Altreu; this area included the municipalities of Selzach and Bettlach, as well as the western part of Lommiswil. In 1340 Altreu was purchased by the Neuenburg-Nidau family.

The invading Gugler mercenary army destroyed the town and bridge in 1375, and the town was not rebuilt afterwards because erosion and changes in the Aare's flow were threatening the town more and more. Solothurner burgher Rudolf Sefrid von Erlach purchased the area in 1377 and gave it to the city of Solothurn in 1389, where it was merged into the Lebern district.

A hamlet grew in the location of the former town which, though part of the Selzach municipality, possessed a degree of autonomy until 1831 with its own Ammann (bailiff), common land, and Weibel (a type of Swiss official with various administrative and ceremonial duties).

== Gallery ==
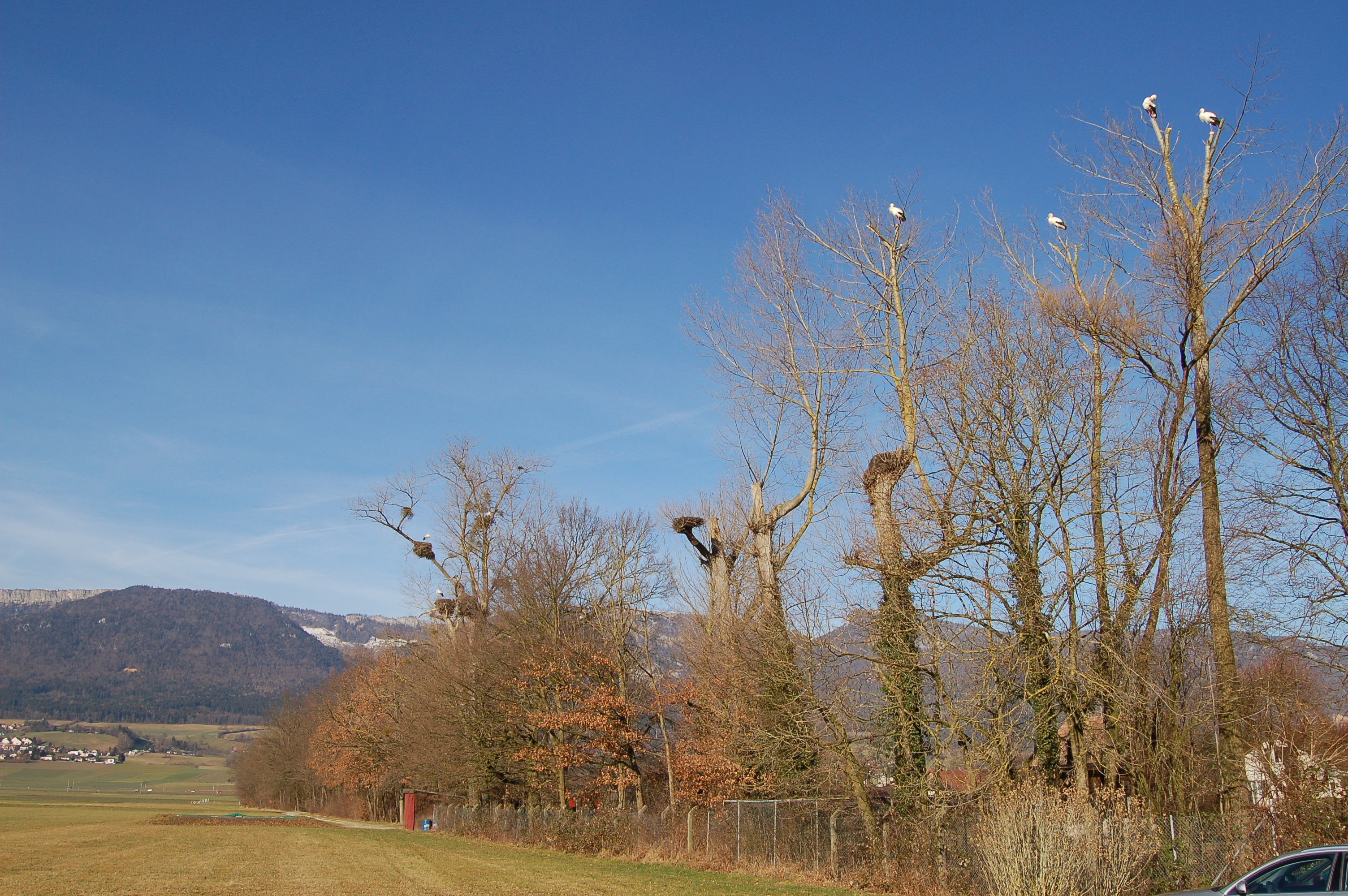
Storks at Altreu

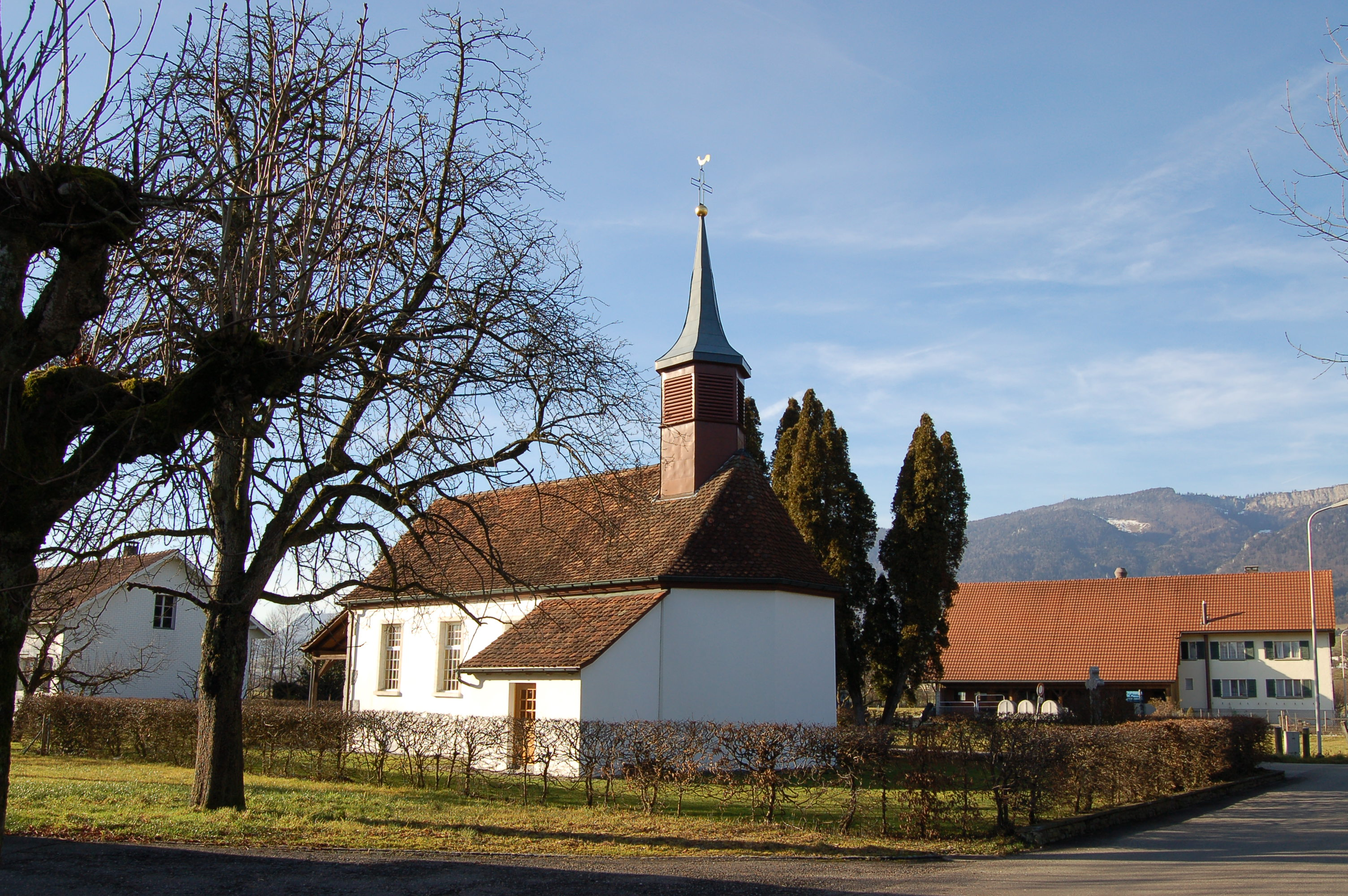
Kapelle Mariahilf (built 1819, renovated 1973)

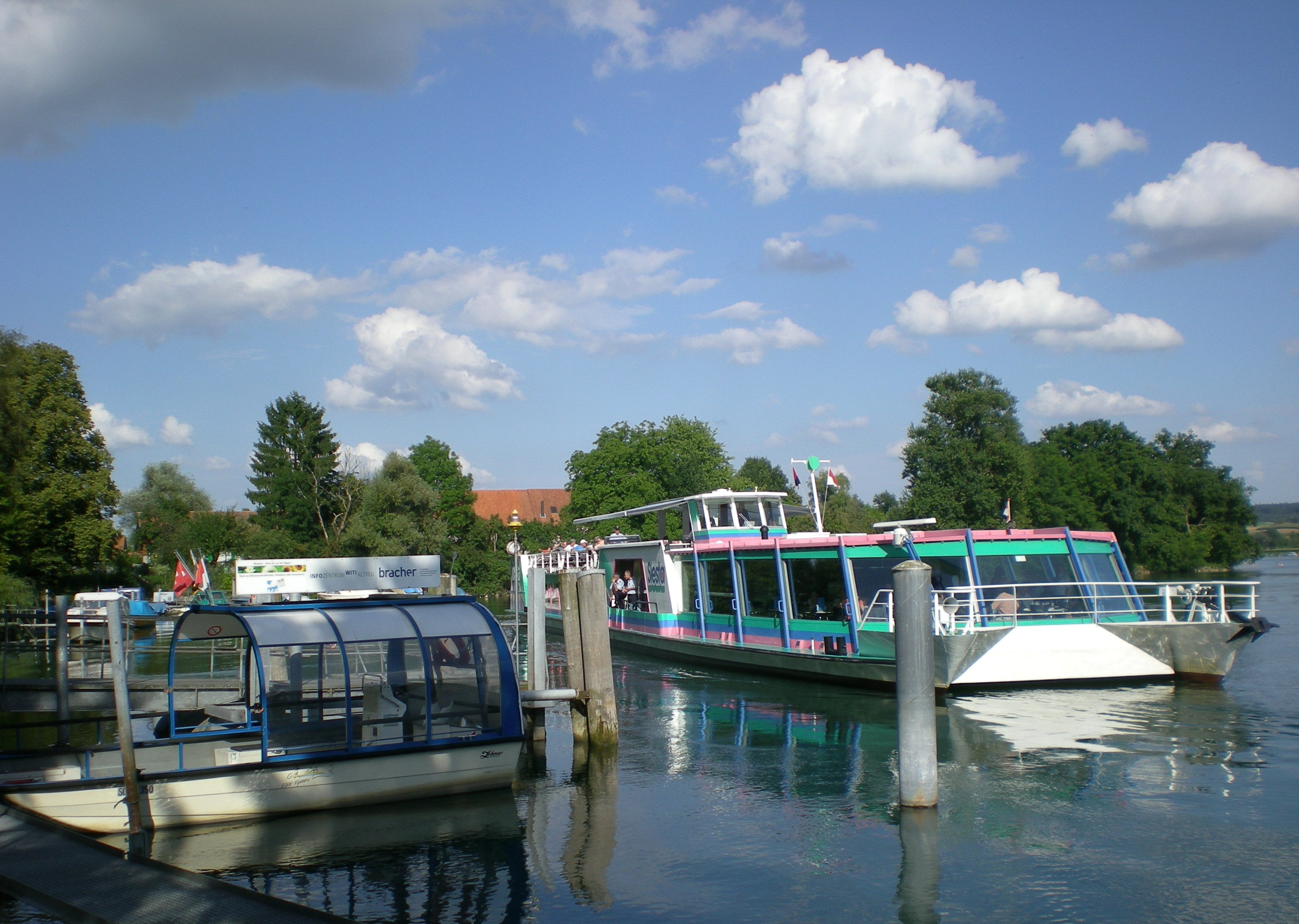
Siesta at Altreu dock

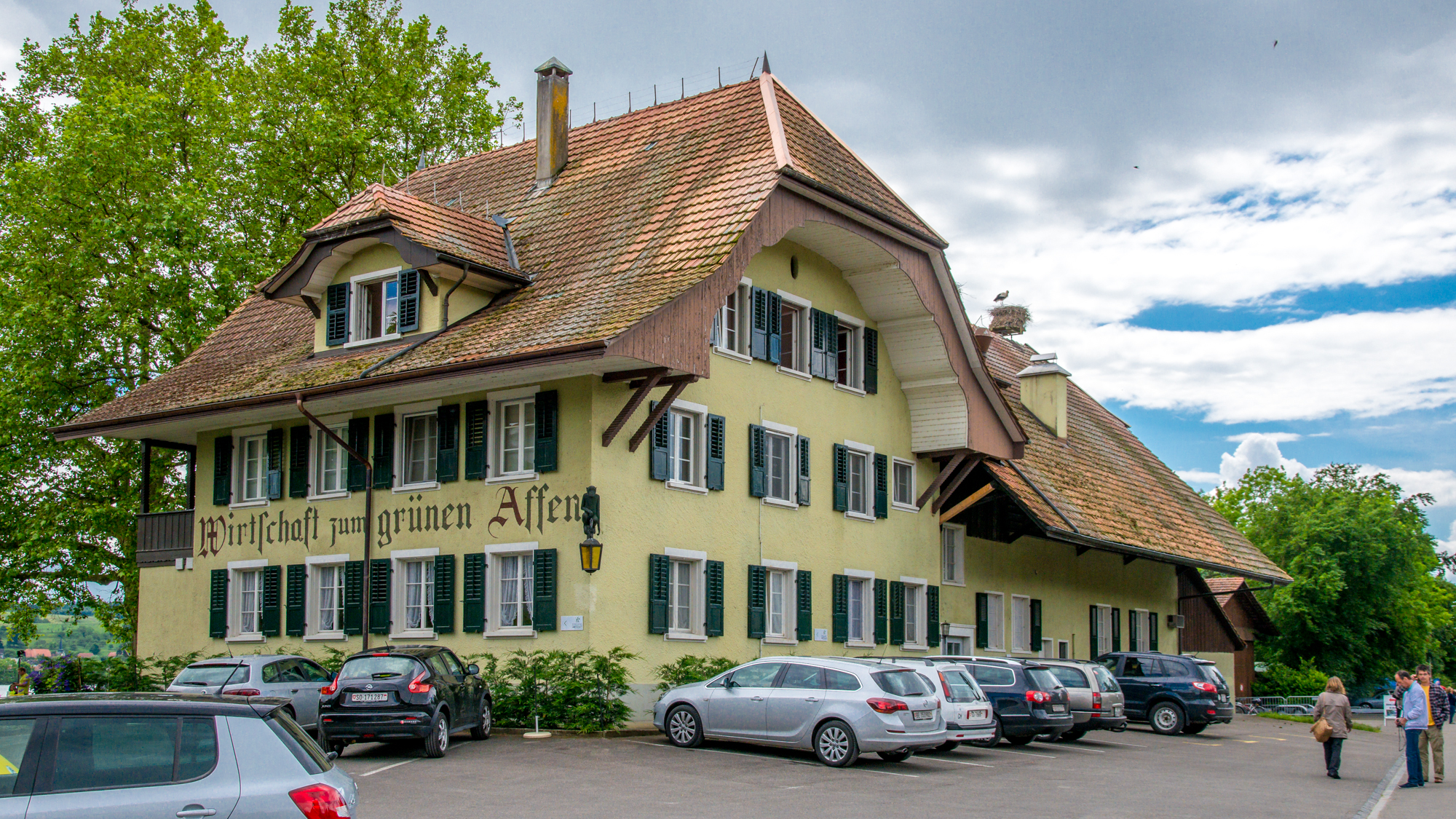
Restaurant zum grünen Affen

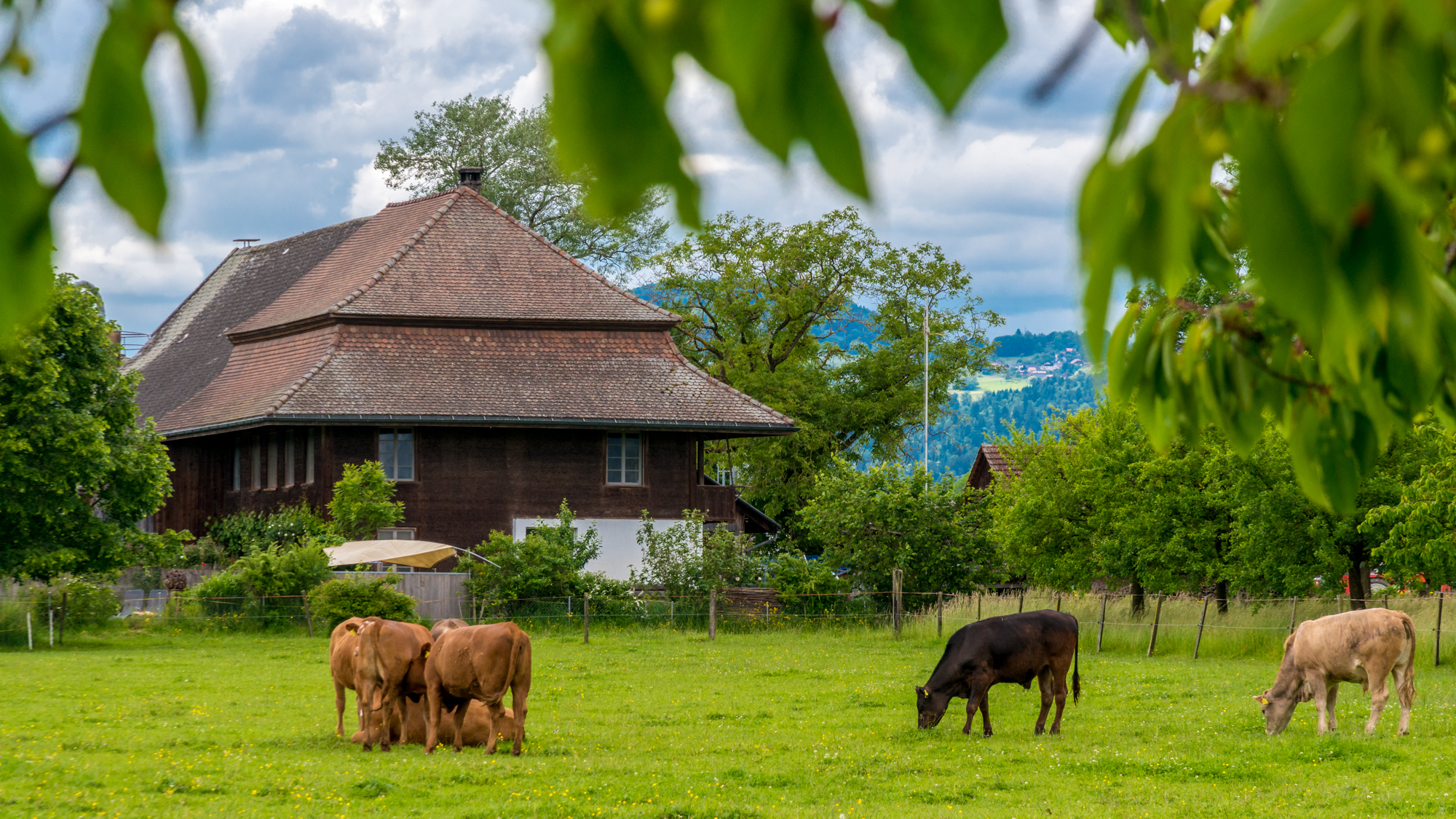
Ettershof

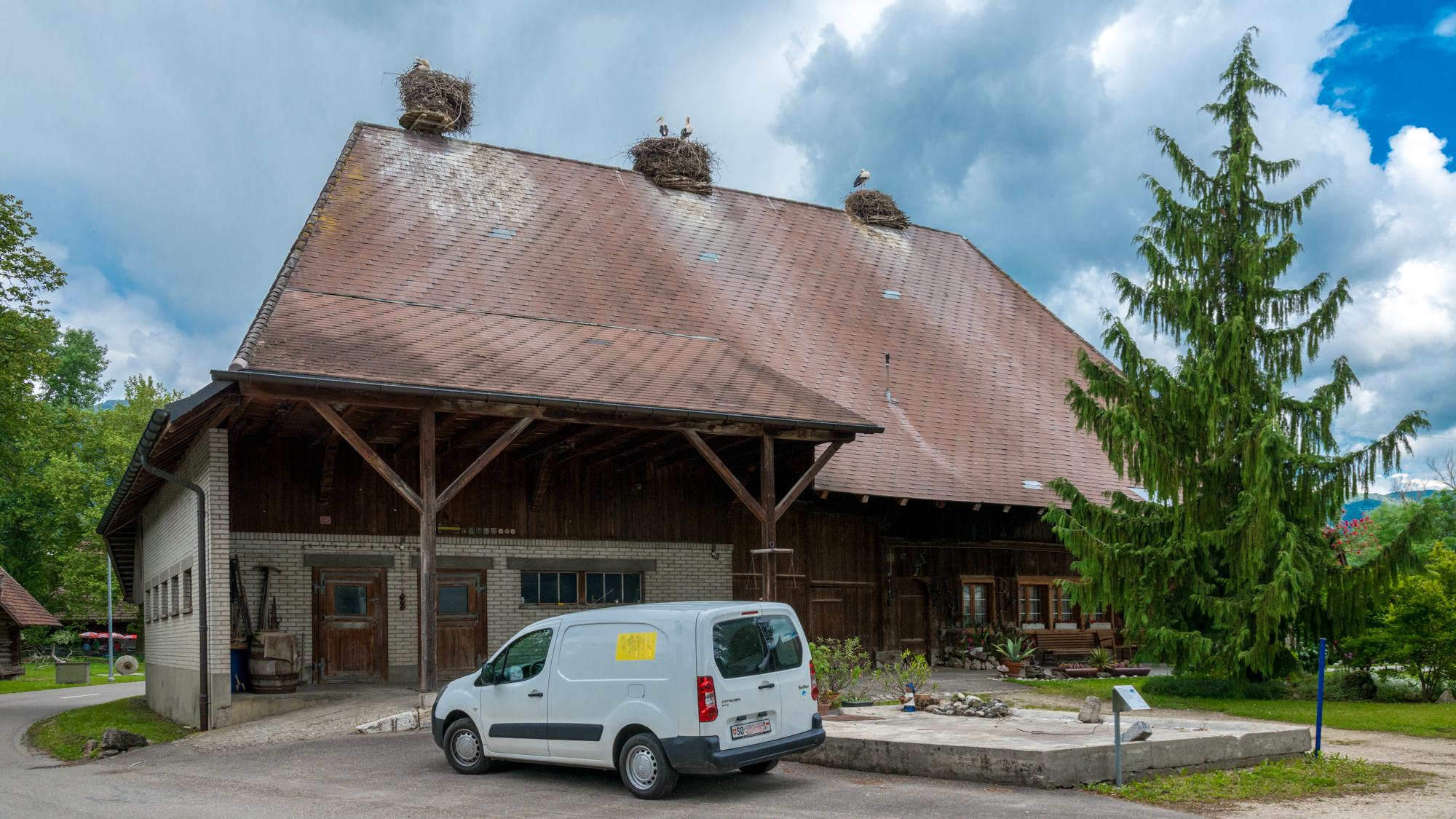
Stork nests on farmhouse
