= Gottstatt Monastery =

- Kloster Gottstatt
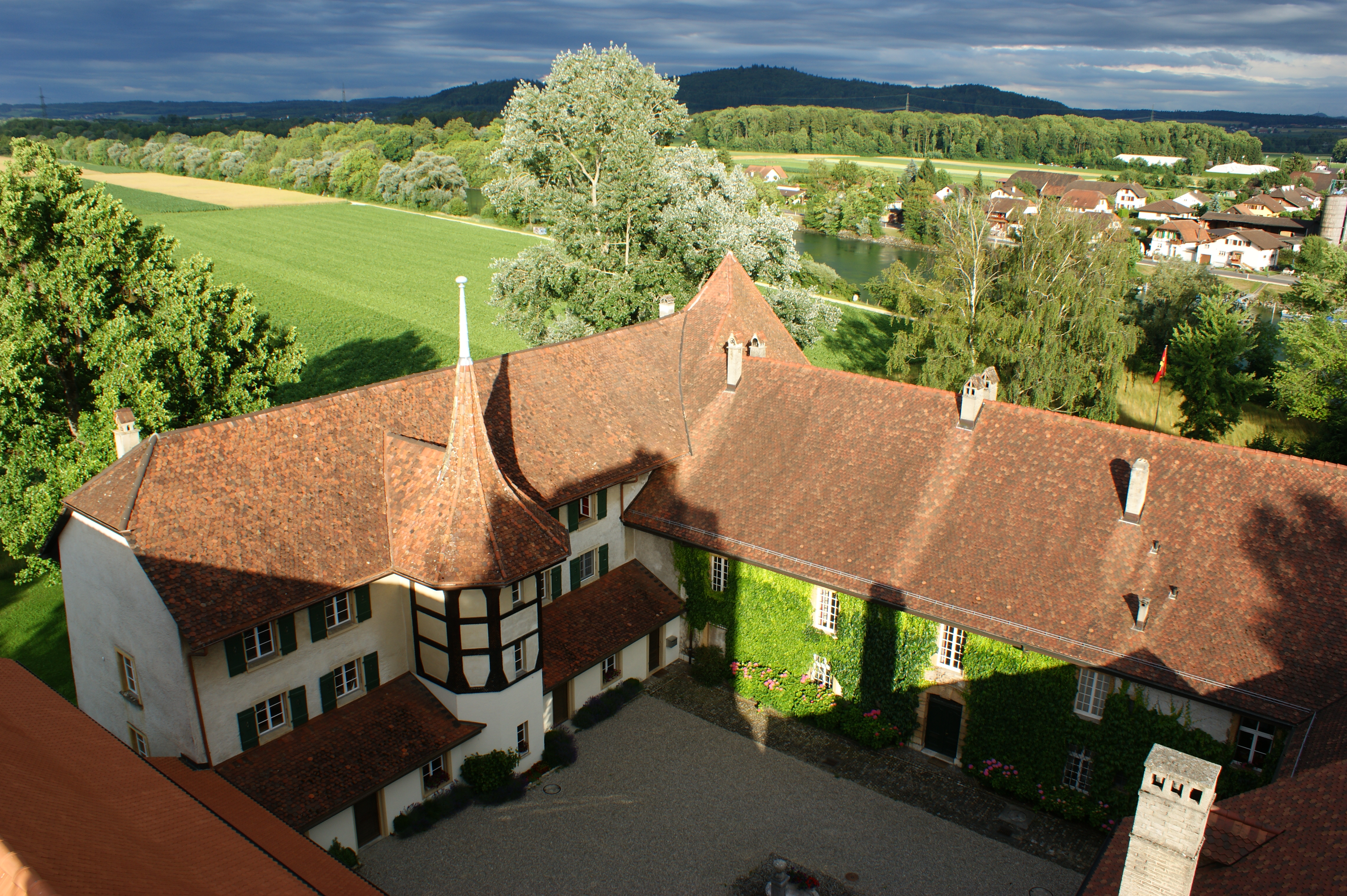

- Location within Switzerland

Monastery information
- Order: Premonstratensian
- Established: 1255
- Disestablished: 1528
- Diocese: Lausanne

People
- Founder: Count Rudolf I von Neuchâtel-Nidau

Architecture
- Heritage designation: ISOS

Site
- Coordinates: 47°08′14″N 7°18′46″E

Gottstat Monastery is a former Premonstratensian monastery in the municipality of Orpund in the Canton of Bern, Switzerland.

== Establishment ==
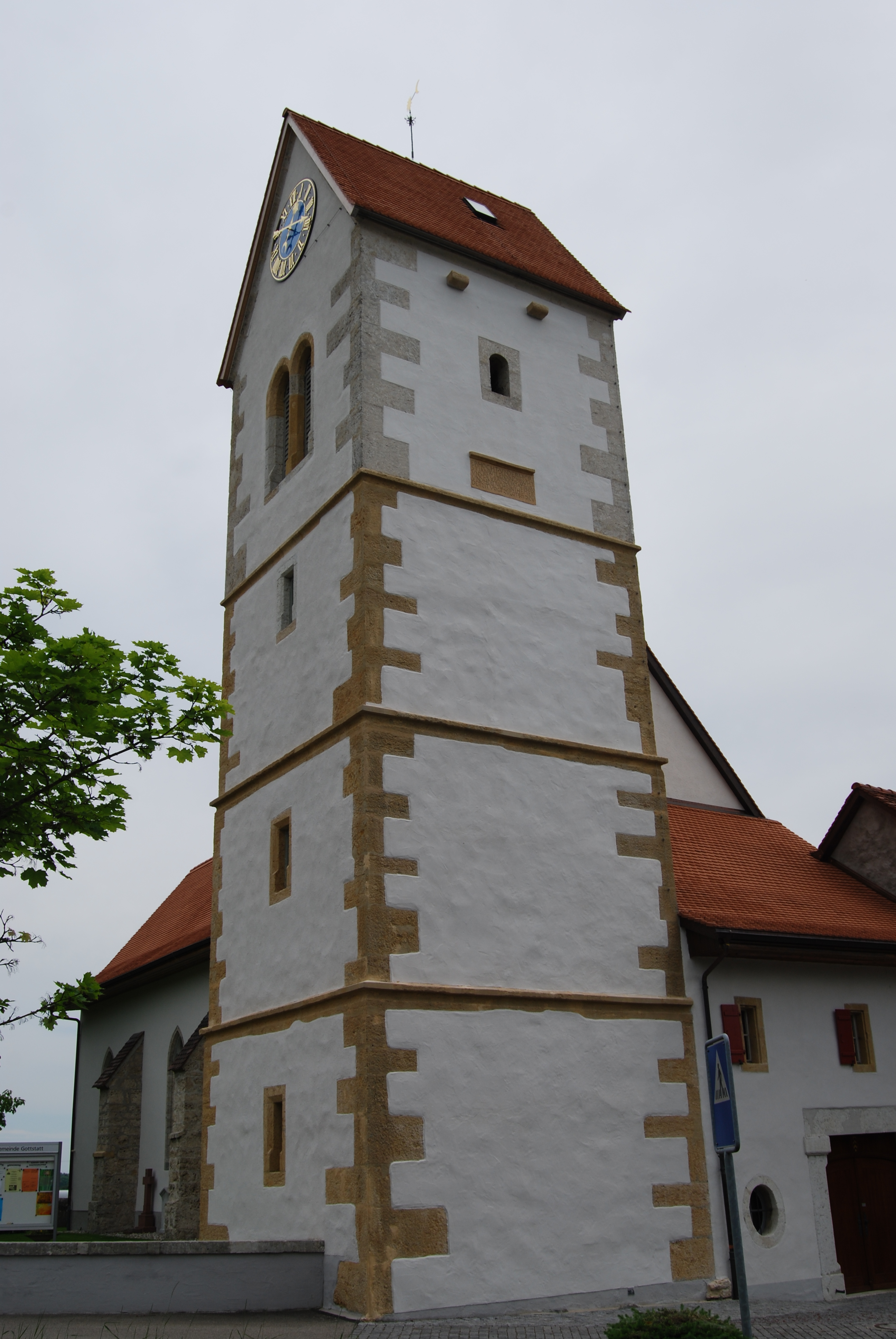
Gottstatt Monastery church

It was established in 1255 by Count Rudolf I von Neuchâtel-Nidau. A previous attempt to establish a monastery on the site in 1247 there had been unsuccessful. The monastery church was built in 1300 and was the burial church for the Counts of Neuchâtel-Nidau. After their line became extinct in 1375, the monastery was inherited by the Counts of Kyburg-Burgdorf until it was acquired by Bern in 1388. Documents from 1295, 1309 and 1314 indicate that the monastery was a local pilgrimage site and expanded several times. A monastery school was in operation from the beginning. During the Gugler War of 1375 the monastery was attacked and heavily damaged by the Gugler knights. Shortly thereafter it was rebuilt. The last construction project on the monastery occurred during the tenure of the Abbot Konrad Meyer (1504–14). While the monastery owned a number of vineyards, houses and farms along with rights in a number of parishes, politically it was fairly weak. None of the 22 known abbots was a nobleman.

== Reformation ==
The monastery was closed in 1528 as part of the Reformation. From 1528 until 1798, the monastery building served as the seat of the bailiwick and low court of Gottstatt.

In 1803 the whole monastery building and compound was sold into private ownership. The Reformed Church began buying back the monastery, piece by piece, in 1965. Today it is the parish church for the Orpund parish.

== Teaching ==
Georg Simon Ohm was a teacher there for some time.

== Literature ==
- Doris Amacher und Bethi Blaser: Schweizerische Kunstführer GSK, Band 773: Die reformierte Kirche und das ehemalige Prämonstratenserkloster Gottstatt, Bern 2005, ISBN 3-85782-773-4
- Andreas Moser: Die Kunstdenkmäler des Kantons Bern Land III, Der Amtsbezirk Nidau 2. Teil, Herausgegeben von der Schweizerischen Gesellschaft für Kunstgeschichte GSK, Bern 2005: Seiten 139-173 Orpund / Gottstatt, ISBN 978-3-906131-80-1
- Helvetia Sacra ABTEILUNG IV: Die Orden mit Augustinerregel, Band 3: Die Prämonstratenser und Prämonstratenserinnen in der Schweiz, bearbeitet von mehreren Autoren, redigiert von Bernard Andenmatten und Brigitte Degler-Spengler, Basel 2002. S. 383–410. Autoren: Kathrin Utz Tremp, Georg Modestin. www.helvetiasacra.ch
