= Gugler =

Mercenaries invading Switzerland in 1375

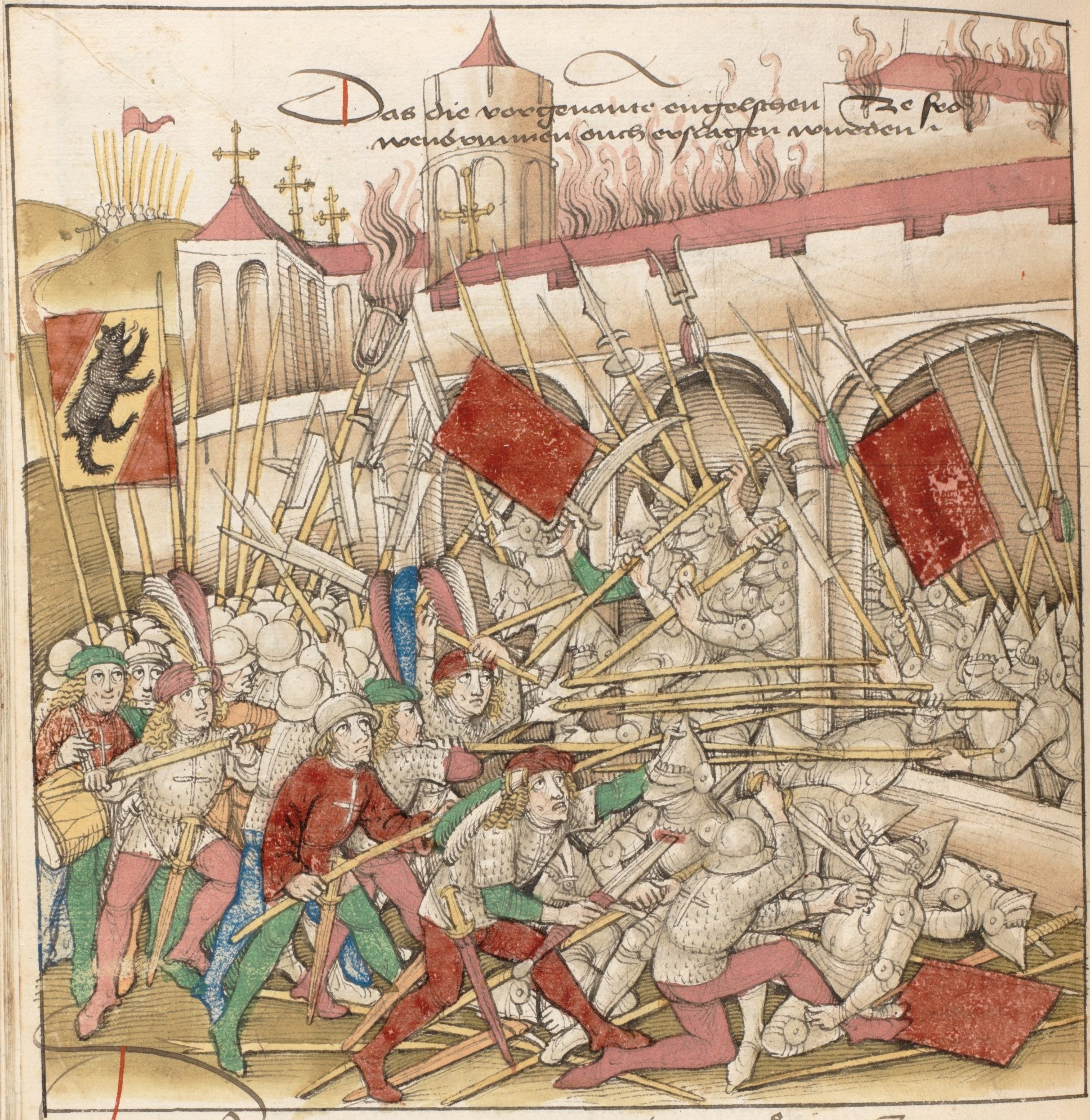
The Bernese attack on Fraubrunnen Abbey, from the Spiezer Chronik (1485). The Guglers, recognizable by their hooded helmets, had entrenched themselves in the abbey. Bernese troops summoned to reinforce the local population defeated the Guglers and set fire to the abbey, which suffered great damage as a result.

The Guglers (also Güglers) were a body of mostly English and French knights who as mercenaries invaded Alsace and the Swiss Plateau under the leadership of Enguerrand VII de Coucy during the Gugler War of 1375.

== Origin of the term ==
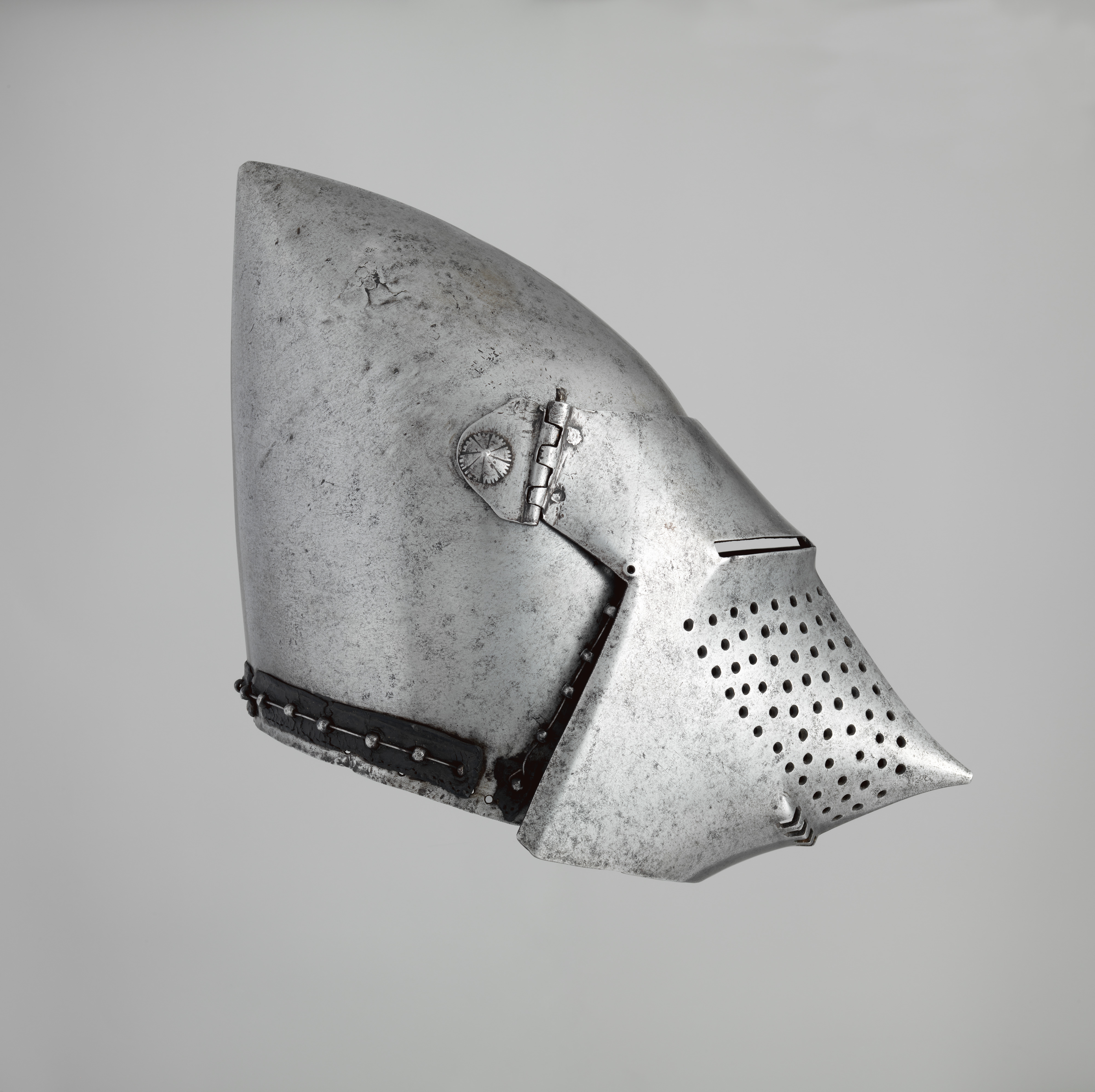
The eponymous hundsgugel (c. 1375–1400)

The term Gugler is derived from the appearance of the knights dressed for winter, wearing hounskull (German: hundsgugel) helmets and cowl-like hoods, Gugle (or Gügle) being a Swiss German term for cowl or point.

== Background ==
During lulls in the Hundred Years' War, unemployed knights and soldiers of free companies often rampaged and plundered the French countryside until they were again engaged and paid by French or English overlords to do their bidding. De Coucy gathered a mercenary army of such knights to enforce his inheritance rights versus his Habsburg relatives. De Coucy's goal was to gain the Sundgau, Breisgau and the county of Ferrette. According to a treaty they had belonged to his Habsburg mother Catherine, daughter of Leopold I, Duke of Austria, but were retained by her relatives Albert III and Leopold III.

The French king Charles V encouraged and financed de Coucy as he hoped to move these free companies off French lands. There is disagreement about the size of the army De Coucy put together, Tuchman estimates them to be a force of about 10,000 men, a contemporary Alsatian document names 16,000, and other writings place the numbers much higher. As the army was plundering in groups it may not have presented a unified entity.

== Course ==
The mercenary forces assembled in the Alsace and plundered the Sundgau in October and November 1375. Forty villages were wrecked and people were killed or raped. Leopold was unable to defend the Alsace and retreated to Breisach on the Rhine. After Enguerrand's arrival in November some dissension arose about the next course of action. The Alsace had been plundered, winter was approaching, and the knights were unwilling to cross the Rhine. Coucy then led the army south.

In December 1375 the Gugler army crossed the Jura Mountains, entered the Aare valley and proceeded in three units. Enguerrand de Coucy led the main army that headquartered at Saint Urban's Abbey, Jean de Vienne led the second unit and was stationed at Gottstatt Abbey, and Owain Lawgoch, the commander of the third unit, stayed at Fraubrunnen Abbey. Some local nobles left their castles and fled to join Leopold, leaving the countryside open to the Guglers. Others resisted, among them Rudolph IV of Nidau, who was killed as the last of the Nidau counts. Resistance was also given by Petermann I von Grünenberg whose attempt to displace the Guglers from St. Urban was thwarted. The pillage by the roaming Guglers affected the western part of the Aargau, where the towns of Fridau and Altreu were completely destroyed.

The local populace organized to strike back and, although outnumbered, were able inflict significant damage in a series of night attacks, first defeating the Guglers at Buttisholz on Christmas Eve. The canton of Bern subsequently formed a citizen army, killed several Guglers with apparently only minor losses at Ins on the night of 25-26 December, and led a decisive attack on Fraubrunnen Abbey on the night of 26-27 December. Owain barely escaped, but another 800 knights were slain. These setbacks, the cold weather, and the obvious resolve of the Swiss populace, led to the retreat of the Guglers; their main army and Enguerrand were not even involved in any pitched battle along the line of retreat.

== Aftermath ==
In January 1376 the Guglers dissolved and returned to plunder the French countryside. Enguerrand compromised with Albert III in 1387 and received domain over Büren and part of the town of Nidau which he lost after only one year to the citizen army of Bern and Solothurn. The successful defense of their lands against foreign invaders helped the Swiss in strengthening their budding independence. They confirmed, after their previous successes at the battles of Morgarten (1315) and Laupen (1329), that well organized armies of common men could defeat knightly armour, a feat they would repeat a decade later at Sempach on their route to Swiss independence. The engagements of the Gugler War showed that the epoch of the medieval knight was coming to a close.
