= Lullier =

Municipality in Switzerland

Coordinates: 46°13′48″N 6°15′30″E

Lullier is part of the municipality of Jussy, Switzerland. It is the site of the Ecole d'Ingénieurs de Lullier, a site of the HES-SO (University of Applied Sciences of Western Switzerland).
