= Robert of Boves =

Robert of Boves may refer to:

- Robert I of Boves (d. 1191), participant in the Third Crusade
- Robert II of Boves (d. 1249)
- Robert I of Fouencamps (d. c. 1227), called Robert of Boves, participant in the Fourth Crusade
- Robert II of Fouencamps (d. 1247), called Robert of Boves
