= Enguerrand =

Enguerrand (or Engrand, Ingrand) is a medieval French name, derived from a Germanic name Engilram (Engelram, Ingelram), from Angil, the tribal name of the Angles, and hramn "raven".

The Old Frankish name is recorded in various forms during the 8th to 11th centuries, the oldest attestation being Angalramnus, the name of a bishop of Metz of the 8th century; other forms include Angilrammus, Angelramnus, Ingalramnus, Ingilramnus, Ingelranmus, Engilramnus, Engilhram, Engilram, Engelram and Hengelrannus. The Old French form Enguerran(d) is recorded as borne by a number of high medieval noblemen of Picardy. The name was taken to England with the Norman Conquest, and was adopted there as Ingram by the late medieval period.

The name was also conflated with a number of distinct, similar-sounding Germanic names, such as Ingerman, which has as its first element the name Ingvar.

Notable people with these names include:

== Given name ==
- Angilram of Metz (died 791), archbishop and archchaplain
- Ingerman, Count of Hesbaye (fl. 8th century), also recorded as Enguerrand
- Enguerrand of Flanders (d. c. 853), legendary ancestor of the counts of Flanders
- Engelram, Chamberlain of France (died 877), chamberlain of Charles the Bald
- Enguerrand I of Ponthieu (died 1045), count
- Angelramn of Saint-Riquier (died 1045), abbot
- Enguerrand de Campdavaine (fl. 1040s), count of Saint-Pol
- Enguerrand II of Ponthieu (died 1053), count
- Enguerrand I, Lord of Coucy (died 1116), also Enguerrand I of Boves
- Enguerrand (bishop of Amiens) (r. 1115–1127)
- Enguerrand II, Lord of Coucy (died 1149)
- Enguerrand (bishop of Glasgow) (died 1174)
- Enguerrand III, Lord of Coucy (died 1242)
- Enguerrand II of Boves (fl. 1204–1219), crusader
- Enguerrand de Créqui (died 1285), bishop of Cambrai
- Enguerrand I of Fouencamps (fl. 1247–1292)
- Enguerrand II of Fouencamps (died 1298)
- Enguerrand IV, Lord of Coucy (died 1314)
- Enguerrand de Marigny (died 1315), chamberlain of Philip IV of France
- Enguerrand V, Lord of Coucy (died 1321)
- Enguerrand VI, Lord of Coucy (died 1347)
- Enguerrand VII, Lord of Coucy (died 1397), Earl of Bedford
- Enguerrand de Bournonville (died 1414), Burgundian general
- Enguerrand de Monstrelet (died 1453), a French chronicler
- Enguerrand Quarton (c.1410 – c.1466), French painter and manuscript illuminator

== Surname ==
- Christine Engrand (born 1955), French politician
- Georges Enguerrand, French cyclist at the 1920 Summer Olympics
- Max Ingrand (1908–1969), French artist working in stained glass

== See also ==
- Ingram (given name)
- Ingram (surname)
