= Enguerrand II of Boves =

Equestrian seal of Enguerrand II

Enguerrand II (died 1223) was a French nobleman, the lord of Boves from 1191 and an inveterate crusader who took part in four separate expeditions across four decades.

== Family ==
Enguerrand was a son of Robert I of Boves and Beatrice of Saint-Pol. His paternal grandfather was Thomas, Lord of Coucy. He accompanied his father on the Third Crusade, where his father died at the siege of Acre in 1191.

Enguerrand married Ada, daughter of John I of Nesle. They were married by 1192, since their eldest son is mentioned in that year. She died between November 1252 and December 1254. They had a son and a daughter:

- Robert II, who succeeded his father but died without issue
- Isabelle I, who succeeded her brother and had issue

== Fourth Crusade ==
Last page of the Short Ordinance for Preaching the Holy Cross in a 13th-century manuscript. Enguerrand's name (Ingeram de Boues) is in the fourth line from the bottom.

Enguerrand is mentioned in an act of King Philip II of France in 1199. In 1202, he began preparations for joining the Fourth Crusade. He transferred to the Priory of Lihons the homage his brother Robert owed him for a house. In May, he donated a tithe to the Priory of Saint-Leu-d'Esserent in exchange for 30 livres parisis. That same month, "on the eve of my journey to Jerusalem a second time", he released the inhabitants of Gentelles from their obligations of corvée and other payments.

During the Fourth Crusade, Enguerrand was one of the leading opponents, along Guy of Vaux-de-Cernay and Simon de Montfort, of the attack on Zara in 1202. After the siege had begun, they withdrew to a separate camp. Finally, disillusioned by the crusade leadership's decision, Enguerrand abandoned the crusade shortly after Simon had done the same. His younger brothers Robert and Hugh also abandoned the crusade. A letter from Count Hugh IV of Saint-Pol claims that Enguerrand was "proceeding to Jerusalem".

== Later crusades ==
Enguerrand assisted Simon de Montfort in the Albigensian Crusade in the autumn of 1212. He led a contingent of German crusaders from Carcassonne towards Saverdun against Counts Raymond VI of Toulouse and Raymond-Roger of Foix. When the counts retreated to Auterive, Enguerrand followed and occupied that strategic town as the counts retreated further. In 1216, as a veteran of three crusades, Enguerrand was held up as an examplary crusader in the contemporary Short Ordinance for Preaching the Holy Cross, a manual for English crusade preachers.

Enguerrand founded the Abbey of Notre-Dame du Paraclet. In June–July 1219, in preparation for joining the Fifth Crusade, he made several donations to his new foundation. He joined the siege of Damietta in September. He was still in the East as late as April 1222. He did return to France. He died in 1223.

== Sources ==
- Angold, Michael (2014) [2003]. The Fourth Crusade: Event and Context. Routledge.
- Longnon, Jean (1978). Les compagnons de Villehardouin: Recherches sur les croisés de la quatrième croisade. Geneva: Librairie Droz.
- Marvin, Laurence W. (2008). The Occitan War: A Military and Political History of the Albigensian Crusade, 1209–1218. Cambridge University Press.
- Newman, William Mendel (1971). Les seigneurs de Nesle en Picardie (XII^{e}–XIII^{e} siècle): Recueil des Chartes. A. & J. Picard.
- Phillips, Jonathan P. (2005). The Fourth Crusade and the Sack of Constantinople. Pimlico.
- Powell, James M. (1986). Anatomy of a Crusade, 1213–1221. University of Pennsylvania.
- Queller, D. E.; Compton, T. K.; Campbell, D. A. (1974). "The Fourth Crusade: The Neglected Majority". Speculum. 49 (3): 441–465. doi:10.2307/2851751. JSTOR 2851751. S2CID 163442765.
- Queller, Donald E.; Madden, Thomas F. (1997). The Fourth Crusade: The Conquest of Constantinople (2nd rev. ed.). University of Pennsylvania Press.
- Tyerman, Christopher (1996). England and the Crusades, 1095–1588. University of Chicago Press.
