= List of principal leaders of the Crusades =

This is a list of the principal leaders of the Crusades, classified by Crusade.

== First Crusade (1096–1099) ==
=== Peasants' Crusade ===
- Emicho, leader of the German Crusade
- Walter the Penniless

=== Princes' Crusade ===
- Bohemond, Prince of Taranto and founder of the Principality of Antioch
  - Tancred, his nephew, founder of the Principality of Galilee
- Godfrey of Bouillon, Duke of Lower Lorraine and first Defender of the Holy Sepulchre
  - Eustace III of Boulogne, his brother and Count of Boulogne
  - Baldwin, his brother, founder of the County of Edessa and first King of Jerusalem
    - Hugh of Fauquembergues, later Prince of Galilee
    - Gervaise of Bazoches, later Prince of Galilee
    - Fulcher of Chartres
  - Baldwin de le Bourg, his cousin and second King of Jerusalem
  - Hugh II, Count of Saint-Pol
    - Eustace Grenier
  - Baldwin II, Count of Hainaut
  - Warner of Grez
- Raymond de Saint-Gilles, Count of Toulouse and founder of the County of Tripoli
  - Adhemar de Monteil, Bishop of Le Puy and papal legate
  - William-Jordan, Count of Cerdagne and Berga
  - Gaston IV of Béarn
  - Centule II of Bigorre
  - Girard Guinard, Count of Roussillon
  - Aicard, Archbishop of Arles
  - Hugh VI of Lusignan
  - Berenguer Ramon II, Count of Barcelona
  - Peter Bartholomew
  - Raymond of Aguilers
  - Raimbaut, count of Orange
  - Roman of Le Puy
  - William V of Montpellier
  - William, Bishop of Orange
- Robert Curthose, Duke of Normandy
  - Odo of Bayeux
  - Arnulf of Chocques, chaplain and later Patriarch of Jerusalem
  - Ralph de Guader
  - Rotrou III, Count of Perche
- Robert II, Count of Flanders
- Geoffrey II Jordan, Count of Vendôme
- Héribrand II of Hierges
- Stephen II, Count of Blois
- Hugh of Vermandois
- Enguerrand I, Lord of Coucy
- Thomas, Lord of Coucy
- Guglielmo Embriaco
- Guy II of Montlhéry
- Alan IV, Duke of Brittany
- William the Carpenter
- Gouffier of Lastours

== Crusade of 1101 ==
- Raymond of St. Gilles
  - Stephen II, Count of Blois
  - Stephen I, Count of Burgundy
  - Eudes I, Duke of Burgundy
  - Hugh VI of Lusignan
- Anselm IV, Archbishop of Milan
- William II of Nevers
- William IX of Aquitaine
  - Hugh of Vermandois
  - Welf I, Duke of Bavaria
  - Ekkehard of Aura
- Joscelin of Courtenay
- Dagobert of Pisa
- Odo Arpin of Bourges

== Post-Crusade of 1101 ==
- Baldwin of Hestrut
- Ghibbelin of Arles
- Hugh II of Le Puiset
- Hugh II of Jaffa
- Sigurd I of Norway
- Hugh I of Champagne
- Hugues de Payens
- Humphrey I of Toron
- Bertrand of Toulouse
- William Bures
- Fulk V of Anjou
- Barisan of Ibelin
- Pagan the Butler

== Second Crusade (1145–1149) ==
=== From Europe ===
- Louis VII of France
  - Robert I of Dreux
  - Peter I of Courtenay
  - Raoul I of Vermandois
  - Thierry of Alsace
  - Alphonse I of Toulouse
    - Roger I Trencavel
    - Raymond I Trencavel
  - Raynald of Châtillon
  - Enguerrand II, Lord of Coucy
  - Eleanor of Aquitaine
  - Henry I of Champagne
  - William de Warenne
  - Hugh VII of Lusignan
  - Renaut I of Bar
  - Amadeus III of Savoy
  - William V of Montferrat
  - William VII of Auvergne
  - Odo of Deuil
- Conrad III of Germany
  - Frederick II, Duke of Swabia
  - Otto of Freising
  - Ottokar III of Styria
  - Henry II of Austria
  - Herman III, Margrave of Baden
  - Roger de Beaumont, 2nd Earl of Warwick

=== From the Crusader states ===
- Baldwin III of Jerusalem
- Amalric, Count of Jaffa
- Melisende of Jerusalem
- Philip of Milly
- Manasses of Hierges
- Robert of Craon
- Raymond du Puy de Provence
- Humphrey II of Toron
- Walter Grenier
- Barisan of Ibelin

== Post-Second Crusade ==
- Philip, Count of Flanders
- Stephen I of Sancerre
- William of Montferrat
- Hugh VIII of Lusignan
- Guy of Lusignan
- Amalric of Lusignan
- Baldwin of Ibelin
- Balian of Ibelin
- Hugh of Ibelin
- William II of Bures
- Gerard Grenier
- Miles of Plancy

== Crusader invasions of Egypt (1163–1169) ==
- Amalric I of Jerusalem
- Philip of Milly
- Hugh of Ibelin
- Miles of Plancy
- Frederick de la Roche
- Bertrand de Blanchefort
- Gilbert of Assailly
- Andronikos Kontostephanos

== Ayyubid–Crusader War (1177–1187) ==
- Baldwin IV of Jerusalem
- Guy of Lusignan
- Raynald of Châtillon
- Raymond III of Tripoli
- Balian of Ibelin
- Conrad of Montferrat
- Humphrey IV of Toron
- Heraclius of Jerusalem
- Gerard of Ridefort
- Garnier de Nablus
- Baldwin of Ibelin
- Odo of St Amand
- Reginald of Sidon

== Third Crusade (1189–1192) ==
=== From Europe ===
- Conrad of Montferrat
- Richard I, King of England
  - André de Chauvigny
  - Baldwin of Exeter
  - Joseph of Exeter
  - William de Ferrers
  - Walchelin de Ferriers
  - Hugh III, Duke of Burgundy
  - Galeran V of Beaumont
  - Henry II, Count of Champagne
  - Guy of Bazoches
  - Peter de Preaux
  - Philippe du Plessis
  - Robert de Beaumont
  - Roger of Hoveden
  - Alan fitz Walter, 2nd High Steward of Scotland
  - Ambroise
  - Hubert Walter
  - William des Roches
  - Ranulf de Glanvill
  - Eustace de Vesci
- Philip II of France
  - Theobald V, Count of Blois
  - Alberic Clement
  - Conon de Béthune
  - Robert II of Dreux
  - Philip of Dreux, son of Robert I of Dreux and a bishop of Beauvais
  - Philip of Alsace
  - Roger de Wavrin, bishop of Cambrai
  - Henry I of Bar
  - Stephen I of Sancerre
  - Peter II of Courtenay
  - Raoul I, Lord of Coucy
  - William II, Lord of Béthune
- Frederick I, Holy Roman Emperor
  - Frederick VI, Duke of Swabia
  - Floris III, Count of Holland
  - Henry of Kalden
  - Herman IV, Margrave of Baden
  - Leopold V, Duke of Austria
  - Rudolf of Zähringen
  - Otto I of Guelders
  - Děpolt II of Bohemia
- William II of Sicily

=== From the Crusader states ===
- Guy of Lusignan
- Sibylla of Jerusalem
- Balian of Ibelin
- Reginald of Sidon
- Gerard de Ridefort
- Robert IV de Sablé
- Humphrey IV of Toron
- Joscelin III of Edessa

== Crusade of 1197 ==
- Henry VI, Holy Roman Emperor
- Conrad II, Margrave of Lusatia
- Henry I, Duke of Brabant
- Conrad of Wittelsbach
- Wolfger von Erla
- Henry V, Count Palatine of the Rhine
- Berthold of Merania
- Aimery of Cyprus
- Meinhard II, Count of Gorizia

== Fourth Crusade (1202–1204) ==
- Boniface of Montferrat
- Louis I, Count of Blois
- Enrico Dandolo
- Baldwin I of Constantinople
- Henry of Flanders

== Fifth Crusade (1217–1221) ==
- John of Brienne
- Bohemond IV of Antioch
- Hugh I of Cyprus
- Leopold VI, Duke of Austria
- Pelagio Galvani
- Pedro de Montaigu
- Hermann von Salza
- Guérin de Montaigu
- Andrew II of Hungary
- William I, Count of Holland
- Henry I of Rodez
- Alamanno da Costa

== Sixth Crusade (1228–1229) ==
- Frederick II, Holy Roman Emperor
- Hermann von Salza
- William Briwere
- Peter des Roches
- Thomas I of Aquino
- Bertrand de Thessy
- Peire de Montagut
- Henry IV of Limburg
- Odo of Montbéliard
- Richard Filangieri
- Balian Grenier

== Barons' Crusade ==
- Theobald I, King of Navarre
  - Hugh IV, Duke of Burgundy
  - Amaury de Montfort
  - Peter I, Duke of Brittany
    - Ralph of Soissons
  - Guigues IV of Forez
  - Henry II, Count of Bar
  - Jehan de Braine
- Richard, 1st Earl of Cornwall
  - Simon de Montfort, 6th Earl of Leicester
  - William II Longespée
- Walter IV, Count of Brienne, Lord of Jaffa
  - Odo of Montbéliard
  - Balian of Beirut
  - John of Arsuf
  - Balian of Sidon

== Seventh Crusade (1248–1254) ==
- Louis IX of France
- Theobald I of Navarre
- Alfonso, Count of Poitou
- Charles of Anjou
- Robert I of Artois
- Guillaume de Sonnac
- Renaud de Vichiers

== Eighth Crusade (1270) ==
- Louis IX of France
- Theobald II of Navarre
- Alfonso, Count of Poitou
- Charles of Anjou
- James I of Aragon
- Alphonse of Poitiers
- John Tristan
- Peter I of Alençon
- Florent de Varennes
- Olivier de Termes

== Ninth Crusade (1271) ==
- Edward I of England
- Charles of Anjou
- Leo II, King of Armenia
- Hugh III of Cyprus
- Bohemond VI of Antioch
