= Crusade vow =

Solemn promise to God that one will participate in a crusade

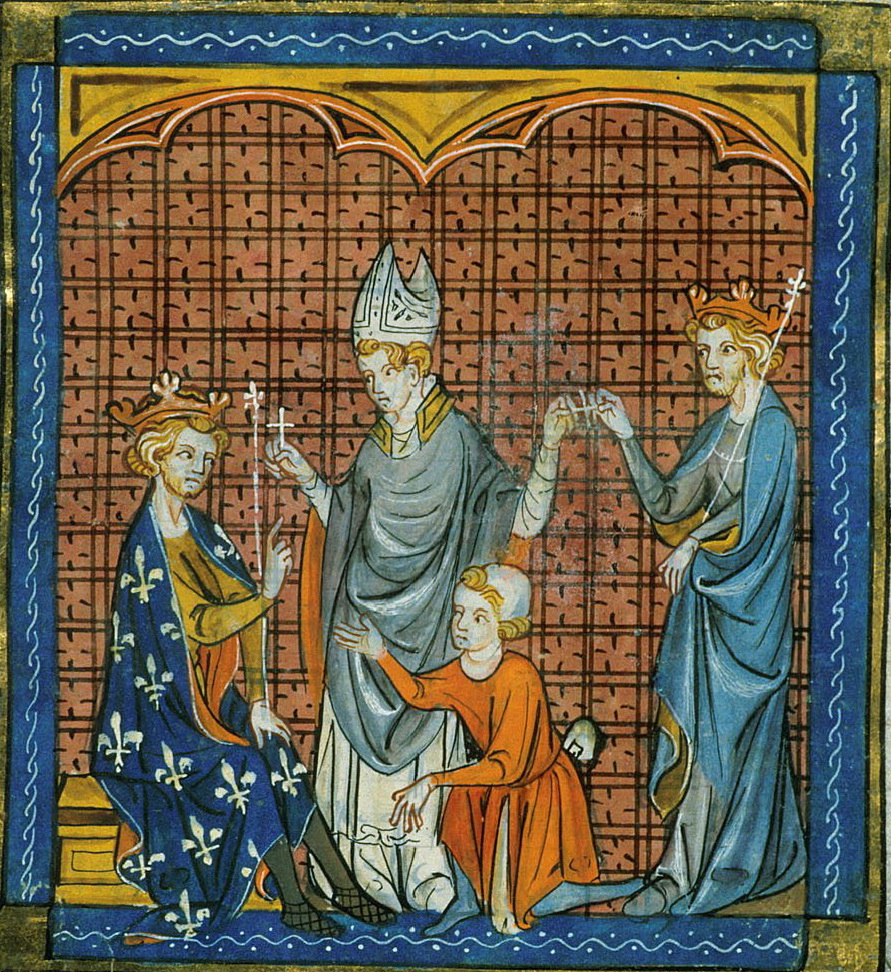
Philip II of France and Henry II of England taking the cross for the Third Crusade, as depicted by Mahiet in a mid-14th century copy of the Grandes Chroniques de France (now British Library, Royal MS 16 G VI)

The crusade vow (also crusading vow or crusader vow) was a solemn promise to God made before a representative of the Catholic Church legally binding oneself to undertake a crusade. The vow and its attendant privileges were among the defining features of a crusade, along with crusade indulgences.

There could be no crusade without crusaders and what made a man or woman a crusader was the making of a vow . . .

The act of making a crusader's vow was often referred to as "taking the cross", since it was normal to sew a cross onto one's garments, a practice that began with the First Crusade in 1095.

== Canon law ==
The vow (votum) was not new to canon law at the time of the First Crusade, but the fusion of it with a holy war was. The idea for such a fusion was first aired publicly by Pope Urban II at the Council of Piacenza in March 1095, where he urged people to take an oath to assist the Byzantine Empire in its wars with the Turks. During the era of the crusades, the nature of a Christian vow was progressively defined ever more precisely by canon lawyers.

In the language of canon law, crusade vows were special (made by individuals), voluntary (not necessary for salvation) and generally solemn (publicly made and legally binding) while they could also be conditional. Two stages preceded the vow itself: deliberatio (deliberation) and propositum (purpose). A prospective crusader could back out before his vow was made.

Crusaders were considered pilgrims. Urban II's other innovation, besides fusing vow and holy war, was to fuse vow and pilgrimage. Before the crusades, only a few pilgrims undertaken devotional pilgrimages may have made solemn vows, but penitential pilgrims (those undergoing penance) never did. Crusaders combined the voluntary devotional aspect of the former with the penitential goal of the latter confirmed with a vow.

== Rite ==
A pilgrim with scrip (wallet) and staff takes the cross, from a 13th-century historiated initial

Crusaders, rather than (or in addition to) ceremonially taking the scrip and staff of a traditional pilgrim, "took the cross", typically by sewing a cross onto their garments, a practice that began with the First Crusade in 1095. The cross was expected to be worn continuously until the vow had been fulfilled. During the Fifth Crusade, some crusaders became so disgusted with the leadership and the misuse of funds that they ripped off their crosses and returned home.

Canon law only began to distinguish a crusader's vow from a pilgrim's vow around 1200. Early crusaders were just called pilgrims (peregrini) before the distinct term crucesignatus (cross-signed) became widespread. A distinct liturgy for the crusade vow appeared around the same time, modeled on that of penitential pilgrimage. Nonetheless, the form and ceremony of the vow varied regionally and there was no standardization. Vows were given in the presence of a priest, a bishop or a preacher or procurator commissioned by the pope.

== Eligibility ==
The crusade vow could be taken by men or women and was not limited to the military class. Clergy, who functioned as chaplains; merchants and artisans, who performed logistical and technological functions; and even laundresses; all took vows. In the early years of the crusade, however, clergy were often instructed not to take vows from persons who appeared unable physically or financially to meet the obligations of crusading. Serfs, other clergy (especially monks and nuns) and minors were often denied permission to take the cross. Married persons were discouraged from taking the cross without the permission of their spouses. Likewise, the elderly and infirm, those lacking military training and "young single women" were often discouraged from taking the cross.

In 1213, however, Pope Innocent III instructed the clergy to accept vows from all willing persons regardless of age, sex or circumstance, while also allowing such persons to commute, defer or redeem their vows.

The crusade vow was sometimes imposed as a punishment for serious crimes in lieu of penitential pilgrimage. It was often viewed as a more honorable punishment than alternatives. This practice was often a target of contemporary critics, who accused it of populating expeditions and the Holy Land with moral degenerates.

== Privileges ==
The crusade vow was a temporary vow that did not alter a person's lay status. In this way it was distinct from the religious vows of lifelong commitment made by priests, monks and nuns. Like such vows, the crusader's vow entailed certain dietary and sexual restrictions, but also the spiritual privileges of a pilgrim. These included the right to interact with excommunicates, the right to take communion in lands under interdict and sometimes the right to a confessor with the power of absolution.

Since the First Crusade, that church had endeavoured to provide legal protection of crusaders' property. Crusaders were granted the right to sell or mortgage otherwise inalienable possessions. By 1145, they were exempted from servicing debts while on crusade. Jewish lenders were sometimes forced to refund interest already charged.

In 1215, Innocent III issued the bull Ad liberandam, exempting clergy who took crusade vows from paying taxes, from the obligation to reside in their jurisdiction and from pastoral duties (provided they appointed a vicar to perform them in their place), while permitting them to mortgage benefices. All these privileges could last for up to three years from taking the vow. Lay crusaders also received the right to be tried only in ecclesiastical courts for certain offences and the right to delay lawsuits. These privileges were so abused that they came to be heavily circumscribed in the course of the 13th century. The abuses of crusade privileges were a target of contemporary critics of crusading.

== Fulfillment ==
The First Crusade combined a military expedition with a penitential pilgrimage to the Holy Sepulchre in Jerusalem. Early crusade vows thus involved the liberation of Jerusalem and performing devotions at the Holy Sepulchre. Failure to achieve or at least attempt to achieve these goals could result in excommunication, leading even to damnation.

Attaining the Holy Sepulchre continued to be the main means of fulfilling a vow for a long time, but the expansion of the crusades beyond the Holy Land and the loss of Jerusalem in 1187 created some uncertainty over the terms of fulfillment. One to three years of military service was sometimes specified in crusade bulls. For the Albigensian Crusade, a term of forty days was specified, equivalent to typical knight's service. The start date of the crusade was usually specified in a crusade bull and enforced by threat of excommunication. Many crusaders ended their endeavour when they personally considered their vow fulfilled. In 1219, Cardinal Pelagius of Albano threatened with excommunication any who abandoned the Fifth Crusade without his written permission after the fall of Damietta. In the end, the terms of the fulfillment of a crusade vow when Jerusalem was not the object of the crusade were fuzzy and never completely settled.

== Dispensation ==
From an early date, crusade vows could be commuted into a penance other than a crusade, deferred to a later time or redeemed by a payment equal to the expected expense of fulfillment. All such dispensations required approval and were at first quite rare, since prospective crusaders were examined for ability. Unlike in the case of regular pilgrim's vows, dispensations could only come from the pope or his appointed delegate.

Dispensations became more common and more well defined in the 1190s. Commutations and redemptions were allowed to those too poor or infirm to serve in the army, while those whose absence would endanger their property or their country could defer. Dispensations allowed civilians who desired to contribute to the crusade with money to reap the spiritual beneftis of the vow. In the assessment of Alfred Andrea, however, "cash redemption ... addressed an immediate problem [but] in the long term it proved unhealthy for Western Christendom because of the abuses it spawned", leading to the sale of indulgences that provoked the Reformation.

Paying for a surrogate to crusade in one's place was a common form of commutation. Many dying crusaders "designate[d] surrogates to whom they bequeathed their crusade funds and obligations." Heirs gradually came to be considered liable to fulfill vows undertaken voluntarily or imposed.

== Works cited ==
- Andrea, Alfred J. (2003). "Vow, Crusader's". Encyclopedia of the Crusades. Greenwood Press. pp. 327–328. ISBN 0313316597.
- Bird, Jessalynn (2006). "Vow". In Alan V. Murray (ed.). The Crusades: An Encyclopedia. Vol. 4. ABC-CLIO. pp. 1233–1237.
- Riley-Smith, Jonathan (2002) [1977]. What Were the Crusades? (3rd ed.). Ignatius Press.
- Slack, Corliss K. (2013). "Crusade Vow". Historical Dictionary of the Crusades (2nd ed.). Scarecrow Press. p. 92.
