= Héricourt =

Héricourt may refer to:

- Héricourt, Pas-de-Calais, a commune of the Pas-de-Calais department in France
- Héricourt, Haute-Saône, a commune of the Haute-Saône department in France

== See also ==
- Héricourt-en-Caux, a commune of the Seine-Maritime department in France
- Héricourt-sur-Thérain, a commune of the Oise department in France
- Battle of Héricourt, 1474, part of the Burgundian Wars
