= Hugh of Boves =

Hugh of Boves, Hugh de Boves or Hugues de Boves may refer to:

- Hugh of Amiens (died 1164), archbishop of Rouen, also called Hugh of Boves
- Hugh of Boves (knight) (died 1215), crusader and mercenary captain
