= Devastatio Constantinopolitana =

The Devastatio Constantinopolitana ("Devastation of Constantinople") is a short anonymous Latin eyewitness account of the Fourth Crusade. It covers the period from the preaching of Peter of Capua in France in 1198 until 16 May 1204, shortly after the sack of Constantinople.

The Devastatio's coverage is detailed and its perspective unique. It portrays the Fourth Crusade as a series of un-Christian betrayals of the poor by the rich. Modern historians have used it more for its factual detail than for its perspective.

== Manuscript ==
The Devastatio survives in a single parchment manuscript bound as a codex, Cod. Marc. Lat. 1990 in the Biblioteca Nazionale Marciana in Venice. It takes up a mere five pages (folios 253^{r}–255^{v}). The same manuscript also contains Ekkehard of Aura's Universal Chronicle; the Annals of Würzburg, which is a continuation of the Chronicle; and a brief account of the Fourth Lateran Council of 1215. The manuscript was completed in the late 13th or early 14th century by two different copyists, one adding Ekkehard and the Annals and the other the Devastatio and the Lateran account.

The Devastatio is unrelated to the Chronicle and the Annals. Its title appears prominently at the beginning and a third person later wrote in the top margin Coronica captionis Constantinopolitanae (Chronicle of the Capture of Constantinople). The account of the Lateran council—which is found in four other manuscripts—is appended to the Devastatio without title or comment. Although they are not by the same author, the copyist probably intended them to be read together, with the council as a happy epilogue to the unfortunate crusade. The Lateran account in Cod. Marc. Lat. 1990 was almost certainly copied from a manuscript of Burchard of Ursperg's Chronicle.

== Authorship ==
The author of the Devastatio is not named in the sole surviving copy of the work and he does not refer to himself in the work. His identity, or aspects of it, must be inferred from the text. There is no scholarly consensus. Most scholars accept that he was from the Holy Roman Empire (Note: Kandel is the exception. He argues that he was from France.) and probably a German speaker from the Rhineland, although Jules Tessier argues that he was more probably an Italian from Lombardy and Cynthia Arthur that he was more probably a Francophone from the County of Hainaut. As to his occupation, it has been argued both that he was a layman and that he was a secular cleric. Mauriciu Kandel believed he was a cleric who functioned as everything from a warrior to diarist to secretary. Arthur believed he was a lay notary.

There is also no agreement on which contingent of the crusade the author accompanied. While Michael McCormick, Carl Klimke and Tessier make him a partisan of Marquis Boniface I of Montferrat, Kandel places him in the following of Count Baldwin IX of Flanders and Arthur in that of Henry of Hainaut. Andrea rejects all these theories.

The date of composition is unknown, but a reference to the pontificate of Pope Innocent III suggests that it was in the past, meaning that the Devastatio was only finalized after Innocent's death on 16 July 1216. It has been proposed that the author relied for some of his information on the letters sent by Baldwin of Flanders to Pope Innocent after he became emperor, but this is not conclusive.

== Content ==
On the third day following entry into Zara, a quarrel arose between the Venetians and the pilgrims, in which almost one hundred people were killed. The barons kept the city's goods for themselves, giving nothing to the poor. The poor labored mightily in poverty and hunger. Consequently, when they complained greatly about the barons, they managed to get ships to ferry them to Ancona, and one thousand departed with leave and, in addition, more than a thousand without leave.

— Devastatio, 253^{v}–254^{r}

The author probably relied mostly on notes he had kept while on crusade. The final work, however, is a coherent and well-crafted history, not a diary. Tessier and Kandel took it to be an official work, but this is not widely accepted. To Andrea, there is no evidence that the author was close to any of the crusade leaders or their private councils.

The Devastatio has been compared to a single-entry account book. The author pays special attention to numbers such as prices and payments and also keeps track of the size of the army by counting fatalities, casualties, leaves and desertions. The number of ships in the Venetian fleet and the number of siege engines is also tracked. These statistics are generally accurate, especially when based on first-hand observation, but they are occasionally infected by "camp rumour".

The author also shows great interest in contracts, oaths, pledges and treaties, a series of eight of which structures the entire narrative. The first contracts are the crusading vows and the pledges made by surrogates to go in place of those crusaders who died before setting out. The compact made by the cities of Lombardy to hurry the armed contingents on their way to the rendezvous in Venice is presented as the first counter-crusade action. The next major contracts are the oath of allegiance taken by the barons to Boniface (who is referred to throughout simply as the Marquis) and the agreement with Venice, which results in the Siege of Zara. At Zara, the crusaders enter into a new agreement with Alexios Angelos to place him on the throne of the Byzantine Empire. In response to this diversion, some dissenting crusaders enter a counter-compact to go directly to the Holy Land. As the crusader army and Venetian fleet make their way to Constantinople, the Greeks they pass along the way pledge their allegiance to Alexios. After the capture of Constantinople, Alexios makes pledges and gives surety to the army in exchange for its continued support as he establishes his rule. Next, the new emperor contracts a portion of the army to help him pursue the deposed emperor Alexios III. All of Greece is said to have paid homage to the new emperor, but he reneged on his pledge and did not pay the crusaders for their aid. The army and its patron fall out, the latter is deposed and killed and the crusaders sack the city. The final contracts occur when the Greeks surrender to Boniface while the crusader army elects Baldwin as the new emperor.

Listen, my beloved brethren: did not God choose the poor of this world to be rich in faith and heirs of the kingdom which He promised to those who love Him? But you have dishonored the poor man. Is it not the rich who oppress you and personally drag you into court? Do they not blaspheme the fair name by which you have been called?

— Epistle of James, 2:5–7 (NASB)

The Devastatio contains two errors of dating. It mistakenly dates Peter of Capua's preaching tour to 1202, probably because the author as a German was not directly familiar with events in France. It also places the assault on the harbour wall of Constantinople correctly on 9 April 1204, but incorrectly states that this was during Holy Week. This error may indicate that the writer was writing long after events.

The Devastatio is devoid of references to the supernatural. Neither does it reference the East–West schism between the churches. Thematically, however, the account is inspired by James 2:5–7. The anonymous author identifies with the rank-and-file, the "poor in the eyes of the world". His attitude has often been labelled anti-Venetian, but it might be better labelled anti-elite. The material success of the barons and Venetians is contrasted with the plight of the poor crusaders. The Devastatio ends abruptly after noting the payments received by the commoners from the booty taken in Constantinople: "five marks to each foot soldier".

== Notes ==
Explanatory notes

Citations

== Sources ==
Editions

- Andrea, Alfred J. (1993). "The Devastatio Constantinopolitana, A Special Perspective on the Fourth Crusade: An Analysis, New Edition, and Translation". Historical Reflections / Réflexions Historiques. 19 (1): 107–129, 131–149.
- Andrea, Alfred J., ed. (2008). Contemporary Sources for the Fourth Crusade (rev. ed.). Brill.
- Arthur, Cynthia Ruth (1981). The Destruction of Constantinople: A Translation with Introduction and Commentary (M.A. thesis). University of Vermont.
- Pertz, Georg (ed.). "Devastatio Constantinopolitana". Monumenta Germaniae Historica, Scriptores. Vol. 16. pp. 9–12.
- Hopf, Carl, ed. (1873). Chroniques gréco-romanes inédites ou peu connues. Berlin. pp. 86–92.
- Muschietti, M. A. C. de; Díaz Pereyra, B. S., eds. (1970). "Devastatio Constantinopolitana: introducción, traducción y notas" (PDF). Anales de historia antigua y medieval. 15: 171–190.

Secondary sources

- Kandel, M. (1927–1928). "Quelques observations sur la Devastatio Constantinopolitana". Byzantion. 4: 179–188. JSTOR 44170068.
- McCormick, Michael (1991). "Devastatio Constantinopolitana". In Kazhdan, Alexander (ed.). The Oxford Dictionary of Byzantium. Oxford and New York: Oxford University Press. ISBN 0-19-504652-8.
- Queller, Donald E.; Katele, Irene B. (1982). "Attitudes towards the Venetians in the Fourth Crusade: The Western Sources". The International History Review. 4 (1): 1–36. doi:10.1080/07075332.1982.9640265. JSTOR 40105791.
- Tomei, Angela (2016). "Devastatio Constantinopolitana". In Graeme Dunphy; Cristian Bratu (eds.). Encyclopedia of the Medieval Chronicle. Brill Online. doi:10.1163/2213-2139_emc_SIM_00878.
