= Robert II of Fouencamps =

Robert II (died 1247), also known as Robert de Boves, was a French knight and the lord of Fouencamps from 1228 at the latest until his death.

A member of the family of Boves, Robert was the eldest son of Robert I of Fouencamps and Marie. A document of 1201 names him alongside two younger brothers, Thomas and Hellin. His father, who took part in the Fourth Crusade, was active in the Latin Empire in 1209, when he took part in the capture of Larissa. Filip Van Tricht, however, has suggested that it may have been Robert II rather than Robert I who went to the Empire in 1209. Robert II succeeded his father, who died sometime between April 1226 and July 1228, as lord of Fouencamps.

In a charter of January 1224, Robert, calling himself "Robert of Boves, knight, eldest son of Lord Robert of Boves", granted the abbey of Corbie toll-free passage for all goods through his lands. The blazonry of the seal accompanying this charter is a field vair, three fasces. The Sunday before All Saints' Day in 1231, Robert II made a donation to the family monastery of Notre-Dame du Paraclet, endowing a perpetual chaplaincy for the souls of himself and his parents. Since this donation transferred to the Paraclet a share of the tolls from Fouilloy, which the lords of Fouencamps held in fief from their cousins, the lords of Boves, it was confirmed by Robert's cousin, Robert II of Boves. In 1232, Robert made another donation of both money and land to the Paraclet, this time in association with his wife, Marie.

In 1237, Robert II rented a wood at Sailly-Laurette from the abbey of Corbie. A document of 1239 is the last to mention his wife, who died before him. In March 1246, he founded a perpetual mass for himself at the abbey of Saint-Fuscien. In March 1247, he named the executors of his will: Jehan de Laucourt, Manessier de Demuin, Jean dit Havernas, Hector de Vers and Raoul de Linieres. He died later that year and was succeeded by Enguerrand I, his son with Marie. He was also survived by a daughter, Catherine, who became lady of Héricourt.

== Sources ==
- Janvier, Auguste (1877). Boves et ses seigneurs: Étude historique sur la commune de Boves. Amiens.
- Middleton, Roger (1999). "The History of Paris BNF Fr. 1588". In Barbara N. Sargent-Baur (ed.). Le Roman de la Manekine: Edited from Paris BNF fr. 1588 and Translated. Brill. pp. 41–68.
- Newman, William Mendel (1971). Les seigneurs de Nesle en Picardie (XII^{e}–XIII^{e} siècle): Recueil des Chartes. A. & J. Picard.
- Petersen Dyggve, Holger (1940). "Personnages historiques figurant dans la poésie lyrique française des siècles XII^{e} et XIII^{e}, VII: La dame jolie de Fouencamp". Neuphilologische Mitteilungen. 41 (1): 12–29. JSTOR 43341238.
- Van Tricht, Filip (2011). The Latin Renovatio of Byzantium: The Empire of Constantinople (1204–1228). Leiden: Brill. ISBN 978-90-04-20323-5.
