= Thomas, Lord of Coucy =

12th-century French nobleman

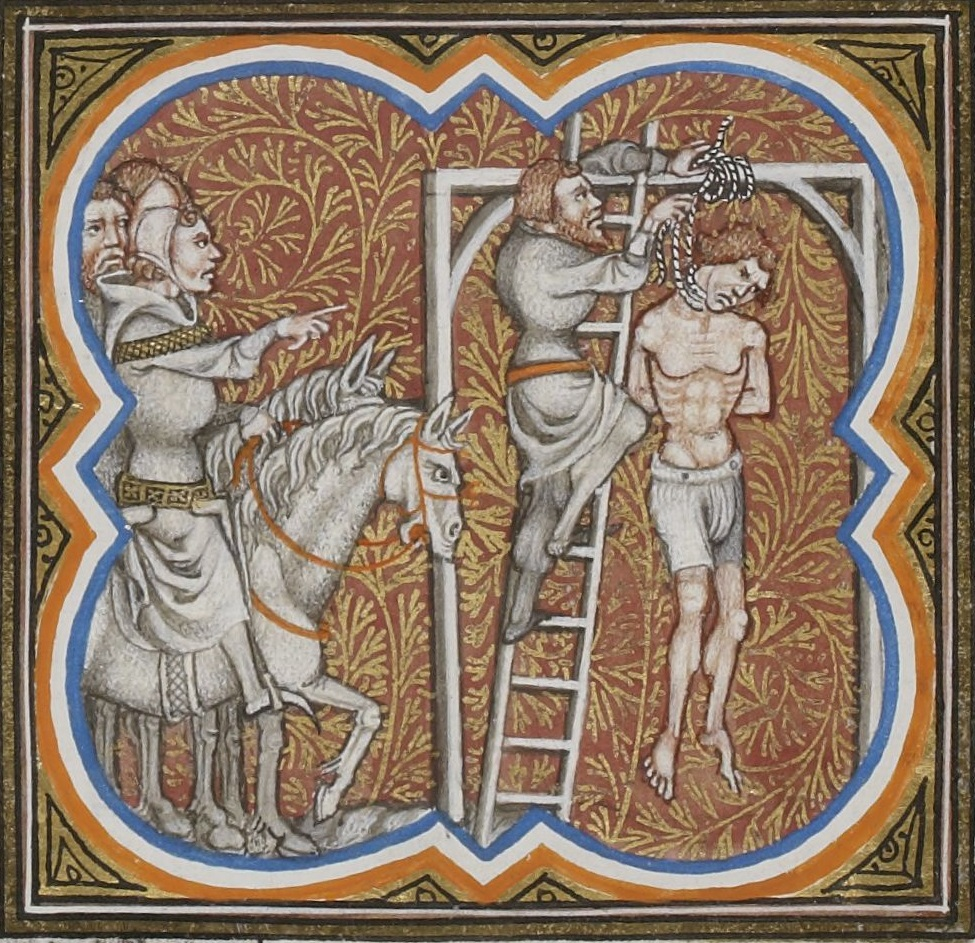

Thomas of Marle, Lord of Coucy, was a medieval French nobleman. He was born in 1073 to Enguerrand I of Boves, the Lord of Coucy, and his wife Adele of Marle. After the death of his father, Thomas became the Lord of Coucy and of his family's other holdings. Thomas of Marle became infamous for his aggressive and brutal tactics in war and his continued rebellion against the authority of King Louis VI.

== Early life ==
In 1035, the first lord of Coucy, Dreux, and Boves, seized the Castle of Coucy from Alberic, its original owner, and established himself as Lord of Coucy. This move seems to have set the tone for the behavior of the following Lords of Coucy, including his grandson Thomas, who would become infamous for his ruthlessness in war.

In 1073, Thomas of Marle was born as the heir of Enguerrand I of Boves, the Lord of Coucy, and his wife Adele, the Dame of Marle. Enguerrand was known as a womanizer but his faults were overlooked by chroniclers due to his continued support of various religious institutions in the area. Although he supported the Catholic Church, Enguerrand I and the previous lords of Coucy were known to participate in a number of local wars in order to gain land and resources.

As the firstborn heir, Thomas would have been educated in the affairs of nobility which would have included the skills and virtues of a knight. As a knight, he was expected to uphold certain chivalric virtues that were used to control knightly and noble violence and disorder. Chivalry was nurtured in France and was used to influence and control the behavior of knights and nobility. It was used as a sustaining ethos of warrior groups who were identified on one hand by their martial skill as horsemen and by a combination of pride in ancestry, status, and traditions of service. Three themes are woven into the fabric of the ideals of knighthood: religious, social, and martial service to their lord. In Thomas' lifetime, the social status of knights and nobles in France was becoming confusing, which culminated in the structured world of knighted nobility in the thirteenth century. Through this shift in the status of knights, the code of chivalry was becoming the basis for society's expectations of knightly behavior. When Thomas began his own military campaigns, it was for his continued abuse of knightly virtues and expected behaviors that he would be remembered.

Thomas and his father grew to become bitter rivals after Thomas' paternity was cast into doubt and his father openly toyed with the notion that Thomas was not his true son. It is possible that because of this uncertainty with whom his father truly was, Thomas became more associated with the surname of his mother (Marle) instead of his father. Nevertheless, Thomas participated in the numerous private wars that were launched against his father and helped defend his father's wealth and land. These private battles were fought primarily by household knights and taught Thomas how to use pillaging and destruction as a helpful tool for taking over new territories and crippling his enemies.

After the famous summons to crusade by Pope Urban II in 1095, Thomas and his father Enguerrand rode out with members of their house to participate in the First Crusade as part of the army of Emicho. According to familial legend, while they were travelling with a small party of their household, Enguerrand and Thomas were set upon by a band of Muslim warriors. Moving quickly, the men of Coucy shredded their cloaks trimmed with squirrel fur (vair) into six pieces to use as banners for recognition and managed to defeat their attackers. The sources are unclear on whether it was Thomas or Enguerrand who created the makeshift banners but this event was commemorated permanently in their coat-of-arms, which shows "barry of six, vair and gules".

Both Thomas and his father returned from the First Crusade to their holdings in France. By right of marriage, Thomas came into possession of the fortified castle of Montaigu in the district of Laon which he would use as a base for his early military movements. Because of the strength in his holdings, he was a threatening presence in the area to his neighbors, who were unhappy with his growing confidence and ambition. According to Suger, Enguerrand made more effort than anyone to drive Thomas from his castle "because of his seditious tyranny." With Enguerrand's support, several barons attempted to enclose Thomas into his castle with a palisade and starve him into submission.

Luckily for Thomas, he was able to slip away and assembled a host of seven hundred knights to retake the area. The barons learned of this oncoming force and begged Thomas to spare them the shame of lifting their siege and facing their lord-designate. They retreated and Thomas quickly destroyed the palisade and reinforced the castle of Montaigu which angered the retreating magnates.

The barons threatened on oath to honor him no longer and, when they saw him leaving with his army, they followed him as though they would engage in combat. The two forces were prevented from battle by a roaring stream that separated them. Eventually the men of the highest nobility, including Enguerrand, came together for deliberation. Deciding to consider Thomas' youth and valor, they chose to defer to him and pledge their allegiance to his cause. Not long after this, Thomas of Marle lost both the castle of Montaigu and his marriage caused by an annulment due to an incestuous relationship.

In 1116, he succeeded his father, Enguerrand I, as Lord of Coucy and added the lands of his mother to their domains. Following the tradition of his forefathers, Thomas of Marle began waging multiple private wars against his neighbors to expand his holdings.

== Warfare and violence ==
Thomas of Marle came into power during a period of unrest with the nobility of France. Abbot Suger of St. Denis' chronicles of the reign of King Louis VI "the Fat" recorded his king constantly marching across his kingdom to bring his unruly lords and barons to heel. Each of these feudal lords were described as violent and disloyal to feudo-vassalic oaths and therefore were the epitome of the brutality that typified the period. As King of France, Louis had taken "vows to put down with his strong right arm insolent tyrants whensoever he sees them vex the state with endless wars, rejoice in rapine, oppress the poor, destroy the churches, give themselves over to lawlessness which, and it be not checked, would flame out into ever greater madness." As far as Suger and his king were concerned, Thomas of Marle was the worst kind of warmonger and represented a threat to France's people, church, and lands.

While Louis VI had been busy waging war against his enemies in England and the nobility within his kingdom, Thomas of Marle took advantage of the distraction and began waging war in the lands of Laon, Rheims, and Amiens, devouring them "like a raging wolf." As he laid waste to the countryside of France, he shocked the Roman Catholic Church when he seized the abbey of the nuns of St John, Laon.

Knights like Thomas of Marle were encouraged to avoid attacking or capturing Catholic churches in war due to their inhabitants being unable to defend themselves or bear arms. The Peace of God and Truce of God movement promised severe punishments, including excommunication, to any knight or noble who broke this spiritual law. European sovereigns like Louis VI recognized the need of presenting their own organizations and conduct as chivalrous which required an emphasis on the Christian vocation of knighthood. Thomas of Marle had openly ignored these spiritual laws when he initiated this attack and did not spare the members of the clergy from violence. As the medieval period progressed, especially during the Crusades, the chivalric code became more closely tied to the spiritual elements of the Catholic Church. A number of orders of knighthood became obsessed with crusading and had a number of statutes that outlined the religious observances that their knights must observe.

As a knight, Thomas of Marle should have been an example of virtues like wisdom, charity, and loyalty, and honor above all while eschewing pride, idleness, false-swearing, lechery, and especially treason. Instead, Thomas became the example of every bad behavior a knight could be accused of. This has led to debate among historians about what may have caused his violence, including potential trauma caused by participating in the First Crusade.

The Abbot Guibert of Nogent, Sous, and Coucy added to the growing rumors of Thomas' atrocities by describing a struggle between the Lord of Coucy and an archbishop. After the archbishop was murdered, Thomas sheltered the murderers and protected them within the walls of his castle. Guibert described Thomas as a man who attained power by preying on the weak, the young, and pilgrims on their way to Jerusalem. He described how Thomas captured prisoners and forced them to endure vicious tortures in order to receive ransoms from them:

"For when he was compelling prisoners to ransom themselves, he hung them up by their testicles, sometimes with his own hands, and those often breaking away through the weight of the body, there followed at the once the breaking out of their vital parts."

Guibert described Thomas as a savage brute who was responsible for countless atrocities and attacks on the innocent. His sins caused the people of the entire region to adopt his bad behavior as well, making him a threat to the peace of France. By abandoning the chivalric virtues of mercy, loyalty, spirituality, and honor, Thomas became the antithesis of the medieval model for knighthood.

Scandalized by this knightly lord's behavior, the Church of France met in a general synod at Beauvais and passed a sentence of condemnation upon their new enemy of the Church, Thomas of Marle. Cono, the bishop of Praeneste and papal legate to the holy Roman Church, led the council in their decision to punish Thomas to the extent of their spiritual ability. Using the spiritual powers given to the church through the sword of the apostle Peter, they condemned Thomas of Marle to be punished with general anathema or excommunication. Cono and the council of French religious officials also removed the swordbelt of knighthood from him, although Thomas was not present, and declared him to be infamous, a scoundrel who was unworthy of the name Christian.

Thomas of Marle's behavior on the battlefield and his brutal treatment of prisoners garnered him the attention of many of France's leaders. As a Christian monarch, Louis VI was persuaded by the results of the general synod and gathered an army to march against Thomas of Marle quickly. He was able to take the well-fortified castle of Crecy, which his followers took to be a sign of God's favor on their mission. Louis VI's army cut down a number of Thomas of Marle's men without mercy and set fire to the castle.

== Death ==
After his victory at Crecy, Louis VI continued his march to the castle of Nogent. An unknown man came to Louis VI as he approached and told the king that the castle was overrun with wicked and unfaithful men. The man claimed that Thomas' men had burned Laon, and several other holy places, to the ground. He claimed that nearly all of the noble men of the city had "suffered martyrdom because they were true to their faith and defended their lord the bishop." These men had even gone so far as to put the Bishop Gaudin to death and left his naked body on the open road so that it would be fed on by animals. All of this, according to the man, had been orchestrated by Thomas of Marle in order to attack and hold this tower.

Louis VI attacked the castle of Nogent, releasing all of the subjects in prison and punishing the followers of Thomas. He commanded that any disloyal man he came upon would be fastened to a gibbet and left as food "for the greed of kites, crows, and vultures." Once Louis VI had taken these two castles, he returned the domains of the monastery of St. John and continued his campaign against disloyal knights and lords. To ensure that Thomas of Marle would gain nothing from his violent and faithless attacks, Louis decreed that none of the heirs of Thomas would ever hold lordship over these cities.

Louis VI continued to press his advantage against Thomas by leading a host of men directly to the center of Thomas' power at Coucy. This action was spurred on by a number of bishops and notable men of France, most prominently the distinguished Count Ralph of Vermandois. Encouraged by his religious fervor and the revenge he wished to bestow on behalf of the church, Louis VI ignored reports of ambushes and the strength of Thomas' holdings in Coucy.

On their way to the castle, Count Ralph came upon a small skirmish with Thomas of Marle present. Thomas had already been knocked from his mount when Ralph arrived and, moving quickly, Ralph struck Thomas with his sword and dealt a mortal wound. Taken captive alive, Thomas was brought before King Louis VI who commanded that he be returned to Laon.

The next day, Louis confiscated Thomas' estates and tore down the enclosures he had built in preparation for war before returning to Laon to deal with his disloyal vassal. Regardless of threats or force, Thomas refused to free the merchants that he had been holding captive despite their rite of safe conduct. Louis gave Thomas' wife, Melisende of Crecy, permission to come to her husband's bedside.

The wounds he received in battle caused him severe suffering. According to the abbot Suger of Saint-Denis, Thomas long resisted making a final confession and receiving the Viaticum, and when he finally appeared willing to do so, he was unable to receive the sacrament before his death. Suger presents Thomas’s death without the Eucharist as a sign of divine judgment on his life.

After his death, Louis VI released all of Thomas' prisoners and relieved his wife and sons of a great portion of their wealth before returning to Paris. Thomas' first born son, Enguerrand II, became the next Lord of Coucy and their remaining lands.

== Family ==
When Thomas returned home from the Crusades and he married his first wife Ida of Hainaut, the daughter of Baldwin II, Count of Hainaut, in 1102 at the age of 29.

Thomas and his first wife had two children:

- Ida (Basilia) de Coucy . Married 1) Alard III de Chimay and 2) Bernard d'Orbais, son of Siger d´Orbais
- Beatrix de Coucy married Evrard III de Breteuil, son of Valeran II Sire de Breteuil.

After Ida's death just a few years later, Thomas married again in 1108 to Melisende of Crecy, the daughter of Guy de Crécy. Their marriage produced four children, including his heir:

- Enguerrand II Lord of Coucy and Marle.
- Robert Lord of Boves (died at Acre in 1191) married Beatrix de Saint-Pol, daughter of Hugo II, count of Saint-Pol and his second wife Marguerite de Clermont.
- Melisende de Coucy, was contracted to marry Adelme, Châtelain d'Amiens, son of Adam, Châtelain d´Amiens. She married before 1162–73 (date of charter) Hugh de Gournay, seigneur of Gournay-en-Brie, son and heir of Gerard de Gournay, seigneur of Gournay-en-Brie, by his wife, Ediva, daughter of William de Warenne, 1st Earl of Surrey.
- Mathilde de Coucy married Guy Châtelain d'Amiens, son of Adam Châtelain d´Amiens.

== See also ==
- List of principal Crusaders

Preceded by Enguerrand I	Lord of Coucy; 1116–1130	Succeeded by Enguerrand II
