= Criticism of crusading =

In the Middle Ages, criticism of crusading was a minority opinion in Western Europe. By contrast, the crusades in general were roundly criticized in the Byzantine Empire and unanimously condemned in the Islamic world.

Criticism of crusading could be limited to a particular crusade or apply to the crusades in general. The dominant strand of criticism was aimed at the conduct of crusades and not at the theory of crusading itself. Although the latter criticism did exist, it was expressed only by a small minority of crusade critics. More often, criticism was aimed at improving the odds of success of future crusades. As crusaders were held to a higher standard than soldiers in other wars, their defeats were often blamed on their sins, such as greed and sexual promiscuity.

The financing and preaching of crusades also came under criticism. In the chronicles of Roger of Wendover and Matthew of Paris, for example, new taxes were criticized as dangerous precedents, while preachers were accused of extorting funds. The thirteenth-century papacy allowed redemption of crusade vows, which meant that men could substitute for going on crusade with an equivalent action or more usually with a monetary donation. This was mostly accepted in Western Europe but still had its critics.

Although criticism was present from the beginning, in general it increased across the main era of the crusades (1095–1291). Disillusionment often preceded critique. The earliest criticism of crusading itself, and not merely the means and effects of crusading, is associated with the failure of the Second Crusade (1147–1149). Gerhoh of Reichersberg initially supported the First Crusade (1095–1099) and the Second, but by 1162 his attitude had shifted. He had concluded that the motivation for the crusade was avarice and that God had willed the crusaders to be deceived by false preaching and led to destruction. The Annals of Würzburg go so far as to claim that the Second Crusade was inspired by the devil:

God allowed the Western church on account of its sins to be cast down. Thereupon arose certain pseudo-prophets, sons of Belial and witnesses of Antichrist, who seduced Christians with empty words. Through preaching they compelled all sorts of men to set out against the Saracens in order to liberate Jerusalem . . . they were so influential that the inhabitants of nearly every region by common vows offered themselves up for common destruction.

Around the time of the Second Crusade, Isaac de l'Étoile criticized the Knights Templar as a "new monstrosity" and wondered what unbelievers would think of plunder and massacre committed in the name of Jesus. In 1214, Adam of Perseigne, who fought in the Holy Land in the Fourth Crusade (1202–1204) wrote against the very idea of crusading:

Christ paid the price of his own blood not for the acquisition of the land of Jerusalem but rather for the acquisition and salvation of souls.

The failure of the Seventh Crusade (1248–1250) sparked a new wave of criticism. Humbert of Romans, in his treatise on crusade preaching, De praedicatione crucis, refers to contemporary criticism of crusading. He also defended the crusading movement during the Second Council of Lyon in 1274. Among the arguments he cited against it were disillusionment due to failures and outright pacifism.

== Bibliography ==
- Andrea, Alfred J. (2003). "Criticism of the Crusades". Encyclopedia of the Crusades. Greenwood Press. pp. 80–81. ISBN 0313316597.
- Paterson, Linda (2018). Singing the Crusades: French and Occitan Lyric Responses to the Crusading Movements, 1137–1336. D. S. Brewer.
- Siberry, Elizabeth (1985). Criticism of Crusading, 1095–1274. Clarendon Press. ISBN 9780198219538.
- Siberry, Elizabeth (2006). "Criticism of Crusading". In Alan V. Murray (ed.). The Crusades: An Encyclopedia. Vol. 1. ABC-CLIO. pp. 299–301. ISBN 1576078620.
- Throop, Palmer A. (1938). "Criticism of Papal Crusade Policy in Old French and Provençal". Speculum. 13 (4): 379–412. JSTOR 2849662.
- Throop, Palmer A. (1975) [1940]. Criticism of the Crusade: A Study of Public Opinion and Crusade Propaganda. Porcupine Press. ISBN 9780879916183.
