= Jeanne de Fouencamps =

Jeanne de Fouencamps (Old French: Jehanne Fouenquam) was the wife of Lord Enguerrand I of Fouencamps (r. 1247–1292). Her family background is unknown. With Enguerrand she had a son, Enguerrand II, and a daughter, Mabille. In a document dated 25 May 1273, Count Robert II of Artois ordered his bailiff to pay 200 livres tournois to Jeanne after the marriage of her daughter, Mabille. The payment was never made because the planned marriage never took place.

Jeanne was an associate of the Puy d'Arras. She is the dame jolie de Fouencamp ('pretty lady of Fouencamps') who judged the jeu-parti between the trouvères Jehan le Cuvelier and Gamart de Vilers, Cuvelier, j'aim miex ke moi. Although Holger Petersen Dyggve identified the Dame as the wife of Enguerrand I on chronological grounds, he misidentified her as Catherine de Héricourt.

== Bibliography ==
- Doss-Quinby, Eglal; Tasker Grimbert, Joan; Pfeffer, Wendy; Aubrey, Elizabeth (2001). Songs of the Women Trouvères. New Haven: Yale UP. ISBN 978-0-300-08413-9.
- Goffin, Isabelle, ed. (1999). L'obra poètica i musical del trouvère Jehan le Cuvelier d'Arras, segle XIII: edició del text de les cançons i de la música. Ajuntament de Castelló d'Empúries.
- Middleton, Roger (1999). "The History of Paris BNF Fr. 1588". In Barbara N. Sargent-Baur (ed.). Le Roman de la Manekine: Edited from Paris BNF fr. 1588 and Translated. Brill. pp. 41–68.
- Petersen Dyggve, Holger (1940). "Personnages historiques figurant dans la poésie lyrique française des siècles XII^{e} et XIII^{e}, VII: La dame jolie de Fouencamp". Neuphilologische Mitteilungen. 41 (1): 12–29. JSTOR 43341238.
