= Ingram (given name) =

Ingram is an English masculine given name, from the Anglo-French (Norman) Enguerran (ultimately Frankish Angilram) Notable people with the name include:

- Ingram Cecil Connor III (Gram Parsons) (d. 1973), country-rock musician
- Ingram, bishop of Glasgow (d. 1174)
- Ingram de Umfraville (fl. 1284–1320), Guardian of Scotland during the Wars of Scottish Independence
- Ingram de Ketenis (d. 1407 or 1408), Scottish cleric
- Ingram Lindsay (d. 1458), Bishop of Aberdeen
- Ingram Bywater, (1840–1914), English classical scholar
- Ingram Crockett (1856–1936), American poet and journalist
- Ingram Frizer (d. 1627), murderer of playwright Christopher Marlowe
- Ingram Macklin Stainback (1883–1961), the ninth Territorial Governor of Hawaiʻi
- Ingram Marshall (1942–2022), American composer
- Ingram Olkin (1924–2016), professor emeritus and chair of statistics and education at Stanford University
- Ingram Wilcox, British winner of Who Wants to Be a Millionaire?
