= Canton of Amiens-5 =

Coordinates: 49.88°N 2.31°E

Amiens-5
- Canton
- Interactive map of Amiens-5
- Country: France
- Region: Hauts-de-France
- Department: Somme
- No. of communes: {{{nbcomm}}}
- Population (2023): 24,448
- INSEE code: 80 10

The Canton of Amiens-5 is a canton situated in the department of the Somme and in the Picardie region of northern France.

== Geography ==
The canton is organised around the commune of Amiens in the arrondissement of Amiens.

== Composition ==
At the French canton reorganisation which came into effect in March 2015, the canton was expanded from 2 to 3 communes:

- Amiens (southern part)
- Boves
- Cagny

== See also ==
- Arrondissements of the Somme department
- Cantons of the Somme department
- Communes of the Somme department
