= Robert I of Boves =

Robert I (born c. 1120 – died 19 July 1191) was the lord of Boves from 1132 or 1133 until his death and the count of Amiens from 1146 until 1184.

Robert was the second son of Thomas, Lord of Coucy, and his third wife, Melisende of Crécy. On Thomas's death, his lands were divided between his sons, with Enguerrand taking Coucy and Robert Boves. At his accession in 1132 or 1133, Robert was a minor. He held Boves in fief from the bishop of Amiens and the abbot of Corbie. He was present in 1138 when his elder brother came of age and made a ceremonial donation to Prémontré Abbey. According to the anonymous History of the Tyrants of Sicily, he was a maternal uncle of Everard, the count of Squillace in Calabria. In 1146, Robert married Beatrice of Saint-Pol, with whom he had four sons and a daughter:

- Enguerrand, who inherited Boves
- Robert, who inherited Fouencamps
- Hugh, who became involved in English politics
- Thomas, cantor and provost of Amiens Cathedral
- Flandrine, married William, a son of Arnold I, Count of Guînes

In 1146, perhaps through his wife, Robert became count of Amiens. That year he made peace with Bishop Thierry of Amiens. In 1147, he took a vow to join the Second Crusade, along with his brother. In preparation for the journey, he restored to the Abbey of Saint-Acheul an income from the mill at Boves that had been donated by his grandfather but withheld by Robert and his father. He was briefly excommunicated in the period 1146–1147, for reasons unknown. In a letter to Bishop Thierry, Abbot Suger of Saint-Denis reprimands the bishop for being too quick to lift Robert's excommunication, calling Robert a "diabolical man". The History of the Tyrants of Sicily calls him "notorious for his cruelty". There is no evidence that he ever fulfilled his vow to join the Second Crusade.

Robert's later career was marked by quarrels. He tried to dispossess his nephews in 1154, was accused of mistreating his wife and was censured by Pope Alexander III. King Philip Augustus sent him into exile in the Kingdom of Sicily. He settled in Calabria. The History of the Tyrants of Sicily calls him "a good warrior, but disloyal", being punished for treachery. In 1156, he was being held in chains on the orders of Maio of Bari for conspiring against the throne. After the murder of Maio, he was among those released prisoners who stormed the palace and took King William I hostage. He reportedly approached the king with a drawn sword only to be fended off by Richard of Mandra. He subsequently returned to France. King Philip besieged Boves in 1184, after Robert took the side of Count Philip of Flanders in his dispute with the crown. The siege ended in a negotiated settlement whereby Robert surrendered the county of Amiens and Boves was raised to a fief of the crown.

In 1189, Robert joined the Third Crusade. He is among those named in the Journey of King Richard and the Pilgrims. His nephew, Raoul I, Lord of Coucy, and his son Enguerrand accompanied him. He died at the siege of Acre on 19 July 1191.

== Sources ==
- Bennett, Stephen (2021). Elite Participation in the Third Crusade. The Boydell Press.
- D'Angelo, Edoardo (2013). "The Pseudo-Hugh Falcandus in His Own Texts". In David Bates (ed.). Anglo-Norman Studies, XXXV: Proceedings of the Battle Conference 2012. Boydell & Brewer. pp. 141–162.
- Fernández-Aceves, Hervin (2020). County and Nobility in Norman Italy: Aristocratic Agency in the Kingdom of Sicily (1130–1189). Bloomsbury.
- Hosler, John D. (2018). The Siege of Acre, 1189–1191: Saladin, Richard the Lionheart, and the Battle That Decided the Third Crusade. Yale University Press.
- Janvier, Auguste (1877). Boves et ses seigneurs: Étude historique sur la commune de Boves. Amiens.
- Lester, Anne E.; Morreale, Laura K. (2025). A Crusader's Death and Life in Acre: The 1266 Account-Inventory of Eudes of Nevers. Cornell University Press.
- Loud, Graham A.; Wiedemann, Thomas, eds. (1998). The History of the Tyrants of Sicily by 'Hugo Falcandus', 1154–69. Manchester University Press.
- Newman, William Mendel (1971). Les seigneurs de Nesle en Picardie (XII^{e}–XIII^{e} siècle): Recueil des Chartes. A. & J. Picard.
- Shopkow, Leah, ed. (2000). The History of the Counts of Guines and Lords of Ardres. University of Pennsylvania Press.
- Slack, Corliss Konwisser (2001). Crusade Charters, 1138–1270. Arizona Center for Medieval and Renaissance Studies.
