= Crusade preaching =

Method of publicizing a crusade

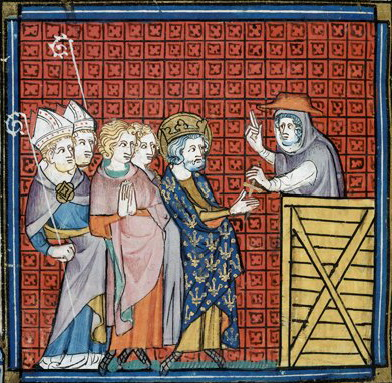
Cardinal Simon de Brie preaching the crusade before Louis IX of France, from the Chroniques de Saint-Denis

Preaching was the primary means by which a crusade, once proclaimed by a pope, was launched. The preaching of the cross, as crusade preaching was known, generally took place under the authority of the pope. This preaching had two main goals: recruiting soldiers and raising funds.

== Preachers ==
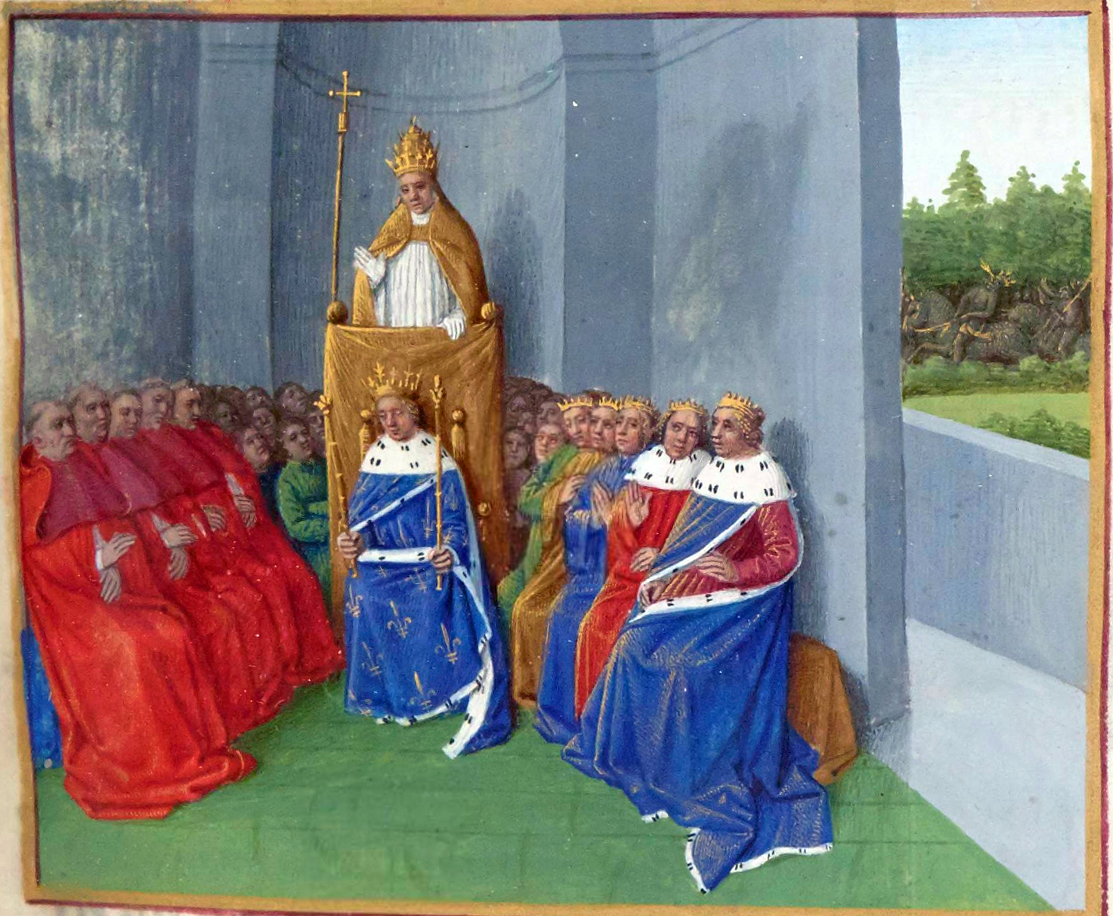
Pope Urban preaching the cross, by Jean Fouquet (1455)

Crusades were preached by clergy at every level, from parish priest to pope. The First Crusade was launched with a sermon by Pope Urban II at the Council of Clermont in November 1095. The crusade was preached by many popular preachers who had no official status, like Peter the Hermit. Although Urban encouraged the bishops to preach the cross, few did so. The success of the First Crusade changed the bishops' perception of such preaching. At least one early expedition, the Crusade of 1129, was raised without any preaching at all but rather through the recruitment efforts of officers sent from the Crusader states.

Several later popular crusades were preached without ecclesiastical backing, such as the Children's Crusade (1212) and the Shepherds' Crusade (1251). These preachers had a messianic and visionary style, preaching a Promised Land unattainable to the rich. Gradually the papacy assumed more control of crusade preaching, including the use of special agents rather than the ecclesiastical hierarchy. Beginning with Bernard of Clairvaux, the leading preacher of the Second Crusade (1147), the Cistercians dominated official crusade preaching. Radulf the Cistercian preached the Second Crusade without permission and was punished. The first use of papal legates to preach a crusade dates to 1173–1174.

Beginning in 1198, Pope Innocent III took a systematic approach to preaching the Fourth Crusade in France. He appointed two members of the higher clergy of each ecclesiastical province to preach, to be assisted by a Templar and a Hospitaller. In 1208, he used the same system for the Fifth Crusade in France and northern Italy. In 1213, he introduced a more elaborate system, dividing Europe into preaching zones and assigning a procurator to each to organize the preaching campaigns. The preachers were called executors and had the status of legates. Hungary, France, Denmark and Sweden were exempted from the scheme. In 1216, Innocent himself preached before a large crowd in the open air during a rain shower at Orvieto.

By the mid-13th century, the main responsibility for preaching the crusade had shifted to the Dominican and Franciscan friars.

== Audiences ==
Crusade sermons were preached not only in churches, but also in marketplaces, at noble courts and at tournaments. Certain feast days were favoured for such preaching, especially the Invention of the Cross (3 May) and the Exaltation of the Cross (14 September). Preachers were sometimes authorized to order local priests to assemble their parishioners for the sermon.

Innocent III granted indulgences to those who merely listened to crusade sermons. His successors gradually raised the value of these indulgences as the crusade waned in popularity. The frequency of crusade preaching also increased across the 13th century through the increasingly systematic efforts of the papacy, peaking in the 1260s. According to Christoph Maier, writing of the 13th century, "it is probably no exaggeration to say that ... the great majority of inhabitants of Europe would have had the opportunity of listening to several crusade sermons during their lifetime." Christian Hofreiter notes that "sermons are likely to have directly shaped the views of a far greater number of people than" other sources, such as chronicles and popular songs.

Crusade sermons were often followed by ceremonies of taking the cross, turning listeners into avowed crusaders.

== Records ==
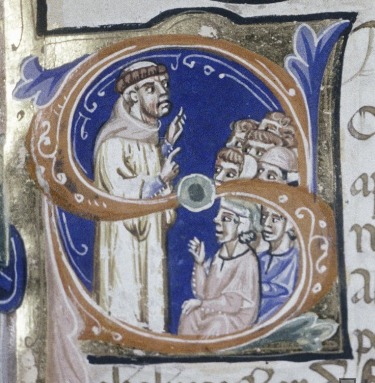
Fulk of Neuilly preaching the cross, from a copy of De la Conquête de Constantinople (c. 1330)

Written aids for preaching the cross only appeared in the late 12th century. These included collections of model sermons and collections of sermon illustrations (exempla). Preachers who sermons were recorded in this way include James of Vitry, Odo of Châteauroux, Humbert of Romans, Gilbert of Tournai and Bertrand of La Tour. In the 1260s, Humbert of Romans wrote a handbook for crusade preachers, entitled De predicatione sanctae Crucis. There also exists an earlier and shorter anonymous tract, the Brevis ordinacio de predicacione Sancte Crucis.

Earlier crusade sermons are occasionally preserved in chronicle sources. Examples include:

- Urban II's sermon at Clermont (1095)
- Bishop Henry of Strasbourg's sermon before Emperor Frederick I (1188)
- Archbishop Baldwin of Canterbury's recruitment drive in Wales (1188)
- Martin of Pairis's preaching in Basel (1200)
- Eustace of Fly's campaign in England (1200–1201)
- Oliver of Paderborn in Frisia before the Fifth Crusade
- John of Capistrano in the 15th century

== Content ==
Crusade sermons generally appealed to listeners' devotion and love of God, emphasising the spiritual rewards of crusading while portraying the crusades as just wars. The emphasis on devotional and penitential themes was important for listeners who would support the crusade financially rather than by taking vows themselves. As typical for sermons in general, crusade sermons were heavy on theology and scriptural exegesis, with special reference given to the wars described in the Old Testament. A crusader's relationship to God was commonly likened to the feudal relationship of a vassal to his lord.

== Related preaching ==
Sermons were also routinely preached before the armies during crusades. They were important for maintaining morale and for showing gratitude to God.

Preaching was also an important part of the Muslim response to the crusades. Imams were expected to gin up support for the war against the infidel during Friday prayers. In 1110, according to Ibn al-Qalānisī, a group of Muslims from Aleppo shouted down the preacher in the sultan's mosque in Baghdad, destroyed the pulpit and urged the faithful to come to the aid of Syria against the crusaders. They did the same at the caliph's mosque the next week, whereupon Sultan Tapar agreed to launch an attack.

== Bibliography ==
- Andrea, Alfred J. (2003). "Preaching". Encyclopedia of the Crusades. Greenwood Press. pp. 246–247.
- Beriou, Nicole; Maier, Christoph, eds. (2025). Philip the Chancellor and Eudes of Châteauroux: Nine Sermons on Crusade and Heresy, 1226–1231. Oxford University Press.
- Cole, Penny J. (1991). The Preaching of the Crusades to the Holy Land, 1095–1270. Medieval Academy of America.
- Cramer, Valmar (1939). "Kreuzpredigt und Kreuzzugsgedanken von Bernhard von Clairvaux bis Humbertvon Romans". Das Heilige Land in Vergangenheit und Gegenwart. 1: 43–204.
- Daniel, Norman (1989). "Crusade Propaganda". In Norman P. Zacour; Harry W. Hazard (eds.). A History of the Crusades, Volume VI: The Impact of the Crusades on Europe. University of Wisconsin Press. pp. 39–97.
- Durkin, Frances Elizabeth (2020). Crusade Preaching, c. 1095–1216: Control, Evolution and Impact (PhD diss.). University of Birmingham.
- Edbury, Peter W. (1996). "Preaching the Crusade in Wales". In Alfred Haverkamp; Hanna Vollrath (eds.). England and Germany in the High Middle Ages. Oxford University Press. pp. 221–233.
- Flori, Jean (2012). Prêcher la croisade, XI^{e}–XIII^{e} siècle: communication et propogande. Perrin.
- Georgiou, Constantinos (2018). Preaching the Crusades to the Eastern Mediterranean: Propaganda, Liturgy and Diplomacy, 1305–1352. Routledge.
- Hofreiter, Christian (2018). Making Sense of Old Testament Genocide: Christian Interpretations of Herem Passages. Oxford University Press.
- Maier, Christoph T. (1994). Preaching the Crusades: Mendicant Friars and the Cross in the Thirteenth Century. Cambridge University Press.
- Maier, Christoph T. (2000). Crusade Propaganda and Ideology: Model Sermons for the Preaching of the Cross. Cambridge University Press.
- Maier, Christoph T. (2006). "Sermons and Preaching". In Alan V. Murray (ed.). The Crusades: An Encyclopedia. Vol. IV: Q–Z. ABC-CLIO. pp. 1090–1092.
- Marx, Alexander (2024). The Preaching of the Third Crusade (1187–1192): The Early University of Paris, Biblical Exegesis, and the Coming Apocalypse (PDF). Brill.
- O'Carroll, Mary Elizabeth (1997). A Thirteenth-Century Preacher's Handbook: Studies in MS Laud Misc. 511. Pontifical Institute of Mediaeval Studies.
- Phillips, Jonathan (1994). "Hugh of Payns and the 1129 Damascus Crusade". In Malcolm Barber (ed.). The Military Orders: Fighting for the Faith and Caring for the Sick. Variorum. pp. 141–147.
- Riley-Smith, Jonathan (2002) [1977]. What Were the Crusades? (3rd ed.). Ignatius Press.
- Tamminen, Miikka (2018). Crusade Preaching and the Ideal Crusader. Brepols.
- Tyerman, Christopher (2017). How to Plan a Crusade: Reason and Religious War in the High Middle Ages. Pegasus Books.
- Verlaguet, Waltraud (2009). "Crusade Sermons as a Factor of European Unity". In Gilles Teulié; Laurence Lux-Sterritt (eds.). War Sermons. Cambridge Scholars Publishing. pp. 1–13.
