= Fouencamps =

- Commune
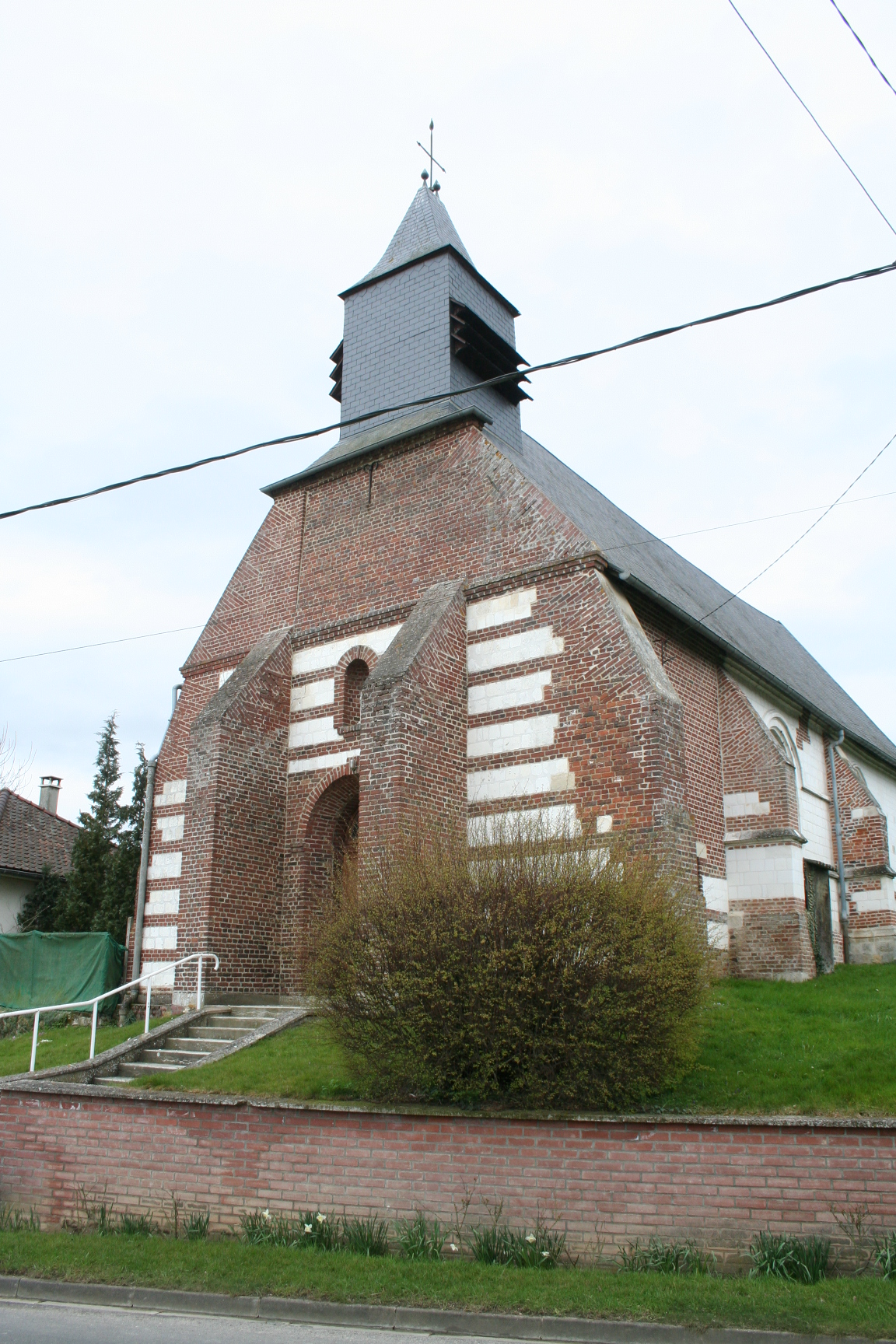
- The church in Fouencamps
- Location of Fouencamps
- Location within France Location within Hauts-de-France
- Coordinates: 49°49′33″N 2°24′31″E
- Country: France
- Region: Hauts-de-France
- Department: Somme
- Arrondissement: Montdidier
- Canton: Ailly-sur-Noye
- Intercommunality: CC Avre Luce Noye

Government
  - Mayor (2020–2026): Yves-Robert Leconte
- Area^{1}: 3.65 km^{2} (1.41 sq mi)
- Elevation: 85 m (279 ft)
- Highest elevation: 99 m (325 ft)
- Lowest elevation: 27 m (89 ft)
- Population (2023): 216
  - Density: 59.2/km^{2} (153/sq mi)
- Time zone: UTC+01:00 (CET)
  - Summer (DST): UTC+02:00 (CEST)
- INSEE/Postal code: 80337 /80440
- ^{1} French Land Register data, which excludes lakes, ponds, glaciers > 1 km^{2} (0.386 sq mi or 247 acres) and river estuaries.

Fouencamps (French pronunciation: [fwɛ̃kɑ̃]; Picard: Flencamp) is a commune in the Somme department in Hauts-de-France in northern France.

== Geography ==
Fouencamps is situated along the D90 road, some 7 miles (11 km) southeast of Amiens, between two small rivers that flow into the Somme.

== History ==
Between 1191 and 1301, Fouencamps was the seat of a lordship held by a branch of the House of Boves. The lords were:

- Robert I (1191 – c. 1227)
- Robert II (c. 1227 – 1247)
- Enguerrand I (1247–1292?)
- Enguerrand II (1292? – after 1301)

== Population ==
Historical population
Year	Pop.	±% p.a.
1968	219	—
1975	196	−1.57%
1982	184	−0.90%
1990	214	+1.91%
1999	239	+1.24%
2007	224	−0.81%
2012	230	+0.53%
2017	208	−1.99%
2023	216	+0.63%
Source: INSEE

== Places of interest ==
- The village church
- The war memorial
- The Mairie
- Chapel of Saint-Domice, on the road to Hailles
- Chapel of Saint-Ulphe, on the road to Cottenchy

== See also ==
- Communes of the Somme department
