= Cagny, Somme =

Cagny
- Commune
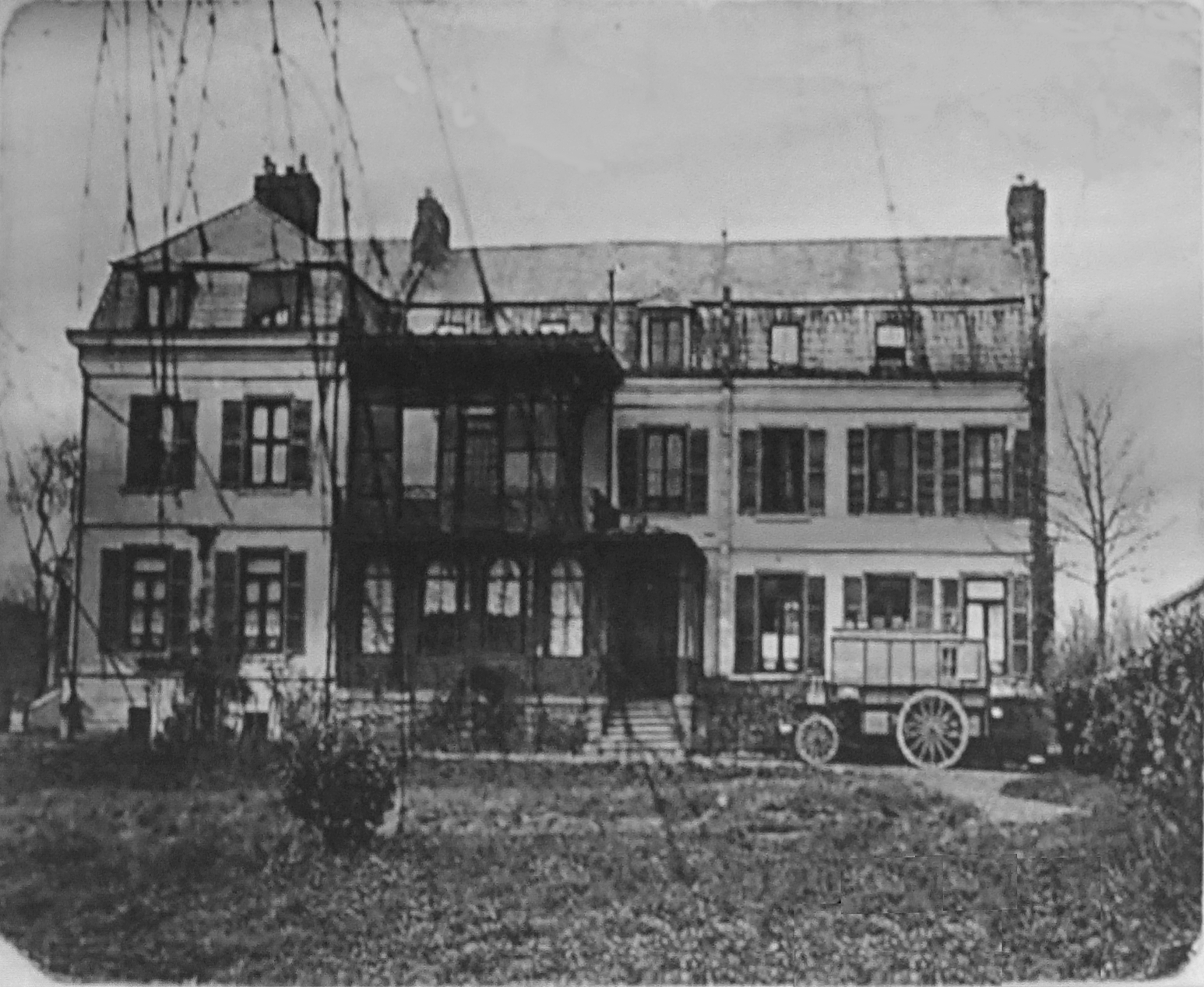
- A postcard view of the chateau of Cagny
- Location of Cagny
- Location within France Location within Hauts-de-France
- Coordinates: 49°51′43″N 2°20′38″E
- Country: France
- Region: Hauts-de-France
- Department: Somme
- Arrondissement: Amiens
- Canton: Amiens-5
- Intercommunality: Amiens Métropole

Government
  - Mayor (2020–2026): Alain Molliens
- Area^{1}: 5.29 km^{2} (2.04 sq mi)
- Elevation: 54 m (177 ft)
- Highest elevation: 107 m (351 ft)
- Lowest elevation: 23 m (75 ft)
- Population (2023): 1,191
  - Density: 225/km^{2} (583/sq mi)
- Time zone: UTC+01:00 (CET)
  - Summer (DST): UTC+02:00 (CEST)
- INSEE/Postal code: 80160 /80330
- ^{1} French Land Register data, which excludes lakes, ponds, glaciers > 1 km^{2} (0.386 sq mi or 247 acres) and river estuaries.

Cagny (French pronunciation: [kaɲi]; Picard: Cagnin) is a commune in the Somme department in Hauts-de-France in northern France.

== History ==
The town was occupied by Germany during World War II, and saw fighting during July 1944. The British attacked on the 18th, but defense from a nearby Flak battery held off the attack, destroying numerous British tanks. Eventually, the British did succeed in liberating the town.

== Geography ==
Cagny is situated on the D161 road, on the outskirts of Amiens, about 3 miles (5 km) from the centre

== Population ==
Historical population
Year	Pop.	±% p.a.
1968	730	—
1975	801	+1.33%
1982	1,026	+3.60%
1990	1,407	+4.03%
1999	1,400	−0.06%
2007	1,291	−1.01%
2012	1,233	−0.92%
2017	1,204	−0.47%
2023	1,191	−0.18%
Source: INSEE

== Places of interest ==
The site of Cagny-La-Garenne 2 has evidence of humans Homo heidelbergensis from an inter-Ice-age environment (about 300,000 years ago).

== See also ==
- Communes of the Somme department
