= Robert II of Boves =

Robert's equestrian seal

Robert II of Boves (died 1249) was a French knight and lord of Boves. He succeeded his father, Enguerrand II, between 1222 and 1224, and ruled until his death.

A member of the House of Boves, Robert II was the eldest son of Enguerrand II and Ada, a daughter of John I of Nesle. He was born no later than 1192. His mother was still living in November 1252.

In 1223, Robert was a witness to a royal judgement issued at Vernon concerning the succession to the county of Beaumont-sur-Oise. In his charters, Robert refers to himself as lord of Boves and a knight. In 1224, he reached an agreement concerning a mill at a place called Pavery with the priory of Saint-Ausbert attached to the castle of Boves. In December that year, he ceded rights and lands to his uncle, Lord Robert I of Fouencamps. He and his uncle, who was often called Robert of Boves, are sometimes difficult to distinguish in the sources. One of them, probably the nephew, was engaged in the Albigensian Crusade in 1224, when Pope Honorius III wrote to his legate, Conrad of Urach, to resolve the dispute between the commander Amaury VI de Montfort and the many knights led by Robert of Boves, who were demanding an increase in their daily stipend. On 22 March 1232, he submitted a dispute with the priory of Lihons to the arbitration of his uncle, John II of Nesle, and another arbitrator.

By March 1238, Robert II had married Helvide, daughter of William, lord of Autrêches. Robert issued a final charter in December 1248. He died in 1249, since a document of that year refers to Helvis as a widow. She subsequently married Renaud de la Tournelle and was still living in July 1262. She and Robert had no children. A supposed son, Robert III, is based on a misreading. Robert II was succeeded at Boves by his sister, Isabelle I.

== Sources ==
- Janvier, Auguste (1877). Boves et ses seigneurs: Étude historique sur la commune de Boves. Amiens.
- Longnon, Jean (1978). Les compagnons de Villehardouin: Recherches sur les croisés de la quatrième croisade. Geneva: Librairie Droz.
- Newman, William Mendel (1971). Les seigneurs de Nesle en Picardie (XII^{e}–XIII^{e} siècle): Recueil des Chartes. A. & J. Picard.
