= Brevis ordinacio de predicacione Sancte Crucis =

First column of the Brevis ordinacio in the Oxford manuscript

The Brevis ordinacio de predicacione Sancte Crucis ("The Short Ordinance for Preaching the Holy Cross"), sometimes known as the Ordinacio de predicacione Sancti Crucis in Anglia ("The Ordinance for Preaching the Holy Cross in England"), is a 13th-century Latin manual for preaching a crusade. It is anonymous.

The Ordinacio is one of only two known crusade preaching tracts from the 13th century, before the fall of Acre. It is the earlier and shorter, the other being Humbert of Romans' De predicatione Sancti Crucis of the 1260s.

== Date and authorship ==
The Brevis ordinacio was written in the decades following 1209, since it refers to the Albigensian Crusade, which began in that year, and is found in two manuscripts copied no later than the mid-13th century. It has often been associated with the Fifth Crusade. The editor Reinhold Röhricht dated it to 1216 on the grounds that it referred to crusade indulgences granted in the papal bull Ad liberandam of 1215. Penny Cole thought it must have been composed after the preaching of the Fifth Crusade began in 1213 and before the crusade itself got underway in 1217, preferring an early date in 1213–1214. The internal evidence is inconclusive.

In the manuscripts, the Brevis ordinacio is anonymous. The text's first editor, Johann Heinrich Nolte, suggested that it may have been written in Flanders or Hainaut, since it is knights from those places that appear in the text's two exempla. Röhricht, the text's second editor, argued from the fact that both manuscripts were in Oxford in the later Middle Ages that the work was probably composed there in an Anglo-Norman milieu, since it includes quotations in French.

Röhricht hypothesized that Philip of Oxford, who preached the Fifth Crusade in England, may have been the author. This suggestion has often been treated as fact subsequently. Penny Cole detected a link between both manuscripts and St Frideswide's Priory in Oxford, which is not inconsistent with the author being Philip of Oxford. Nevertheless, the authorship of the anonymous Brevis ordinacio remains entirely in the realm of onjecture.

== Structure and genre ==
The Brevis ordinacio has an introductory paragraph set off from the main text, which consists of four sections, the last three of which have headings. The three titled sections are:

- De circumstantiis crucis ("On the circumstances of the cross"), a description of the crucifixion of Jesus
- De carne et eius deliciis ("About the flesh and its pleasures"), on sin and the need for redemption
- De uocatione hominum ad crucem ("The call of men to the cross"), a series of crusade appeals and exempla

The first untitled section as well as the second and third begin with decorative initials in both manuscripts. The first section is three times as long as any of the others. There are no paragraph divisions in either manuscript. Christoph Maier's edition has 56 paragraphs plus the brief introduction.

This structure has puzzled scholars since the text's initial publication. Valmar Cramer considered it a composite work, combining an unfinished theological tract on the eucharist and the cross of Jesus with three sketches for crusade sermons. Penny Cole considered it "a theoretical work providing useful advice to preachers on how to preach the crusade effectively". She identified the final six exempla as an appendix to the main text.

Röhricht believed that the Brevis ordinacio was a sermon originally delivered in French. It contains two quotations in French attributed to knights from Normandy and Flanders. Röhricht and Cramer's view that the text is a sermon or series of sermon sketches is rejected by Cole and Maier, who view it as a manual for preachers. Cole classifies it as ars praedicandi; Maier rejects this. Maier concludes that the only other known text of its type is Humbert of Romans' De predicatione Sancti Crucis.

== Content ==
The Brevis ordinacio has been synopsized by Cole and Maier. The latter identifies the unifying theme as imitation of Christ, which was by the early 13th century a key idea for "contextualising crusading". Crusading is presented as a vocation superior to "the ordinary life of the laity". The focus is on the salvation of the individual and the health of his soul rather than on the liberation of Jerusalem or the Holy Land.

The first three sections form "a series of meditations on the allegorical significance ... of a series of themes centred upon the figure of Christ on the cross" aimed at a lay audience of crusaders. "Complicated theology is to be expounded through simple metaphors and reference to familiar cults", like the eucharist. The first section concerns life and death, original sin, redemption and eternal life. The crusader seeks eternal life through risk of death and the church lightens his load through indulgences. The second section is concerned with the crucifixion and redemption. The third, essentially a list of sins requiring redemption, is heavy with allegory and light on argument.

The final section is a list of appeals to be used by crusade preachers followed by a series of exempla. Some of these appeals may have been directed at women in the audience, encouraging them to help their men enlist and to celebrate the dangerous up to and including martyrdom. In the story of "Eustace and Geoffrey, Flemish knights and brothers", the latter suffers an accident and cannot join battle, but Eustace refuses to wait for him so that "I will have the great advantage of coming to God fifteen days before you". He dies in battle and his mother "praised God that he had had such regard for her that she gave birth to such a son". The names Eustace and Geoffrey allude to Eustace III of Boulogne and his brother, Godfrey of Bouillon, leaders of the First Crusade.

The exempla at the very end are prefaced by an explanation of their purpose in a sermon (e.g., to prevent boredom and inspire contrition). Each exemplum ends with an exhortation to "rise up" based on Jesus' words in Matthew 16:24. The second exemplum reads:

A certain knight was captured by Saracens and hung on the wall where rocks kept hitting which the Christians were flinging to destroy the wall, and the Christians stopped flinging rocks there, because they feared killing the knight who was hanging there. When the knight saw this, he beseeched the Christians by the shedding of the blood of Jesus Christ not to stop on his account. And, therefore, they did not stop, and flung a rock which by God's grace hit the ropes and rags on which the knight was hanging on the wall and broke them, and the knight was freed and ran unharmed to the Christians.

Final paragraph of the Brevis ordinacio, including the last four exempla

The last two exempla concern named historical individuals:

- Hugh de Beauchamp, whose death at the battle of Hattin (1187) is recorded by Roger of Howden, is said to have uttered a pun on his surname while dying: "I have never been in a beautiful field until today and yet I am called 'of the Beautiful Field'." This is followed by the exhortation: "Rise up so that you may come to the beautiful field!"
- Enguerrand II of Boves is quoted in French, Viulte est de cheualer ke l'enporte plus tost hors a l'us les piez ke la teste ("It is shameful that a knight should rather use his feet than his head"), which apparently inspired many others to take up the cross.

== Influence ==
The influence of the Brevis ordinacio was not great. It survives in only two manuscripts, one of these showing no signs of use. It was probably superseded by the appearance of collections of model crusade sermons in the 1230s. The content of its first three parts is "clear but hardly rabble-rousing". In Gerald of Wales' description of Archbishop Baldwin of Canterbury's preaching the crusade in Wales, there is no mention of the theological themes of the first three parts.

== Manuscripts and editions ==
The two manuscripts that preserve the Brevis ordinacio are:

- Oxford, Balliol College, MS 167, fols. 212v–215r
- Antwerp, Museum Plantin-Moretus, MS M103, fols. 57r–64v

The Antwerp manuscript is a composite made up of three different manuscripts copied by three different scribes between about 1200 and 1260. They were bound together as one possibly in the same century. The second part, which contains the Brevis ordinacio, also contains the Epistula ad fratres de Monte Dei of William of Saint-Thierry and the Meditationes of Guigues I of Chartreuse, albeit both misattributed to Bernard of Clairvaux. In the late 15th century, the manuscript was donated to All Souls College, Oxford, by Robert Warham, the father of Archbishop William Warham. How it ended up in Antwerp is unknown. Marks in the margins indicate that the text in the Antwerp manuscript saw some use.

The Oxford manuscript is also a composite manuscript copied between about 1200 and 1260 and bound together perhaps as early as that century. It contains four parts, the fourth comprising the Brevis ordinacio and the De connubio Iacobi of Robert of Cricklade copied by a single hand. De connubio is the only other work the manuscripts have in common, although in the Antwerp manuscript it is by a different hand from Brevis ordinacio. There are no indications that the text in the Oxford manuscript was ever used. The relationship between the two manuscript is uncertain but there is little variation between them.

Christoph Maier recently published a new edition with an English translation. The first published edition was a diplomatic edition based on the Antwerp manuscript only:

- Nolte, Johann Heinrich, ed. (1877). "Un traité inédit de Santa Cruce". Revue des sciences ecclésiastiques. 4. 5 (53): 346–368.

A second edition based on both manuscripts appeared two years later:

- Röhricht, Reinhold, ed. (1879). "Ordinacio de Predicacione S. Crucis in Anglia". Quinti Belli Sacri Scriptores Minores. Série historique 2. Geneva: Publications de la Société de l'Orient Latin. pp. 1–26.

== Bibliography ==
- Cole, Penny J. (1991). The Preaching of the Crusades to the Holy Land, 1095–1270. Medieval Academy of America.
- Cramer, Valmar (1939). "Kreuzpredigt und Kreuzzugsgedanken von Bernhard von Clairvaux bis Humbertvon Romans". Das Heilige Land in Vergangenheit und Gegenwart. 1: 43–204.
- Maier, Christoph T. (1994). Preaching the Crusades: Mendicant Friars and the Cross in the Thirteenth Century. Cambridge University Press.
- Maier, Christoph T. (2019). "Brevis Ordinacio de Predicacione Sancte Crucis: Edition, Translation and Commentary". Crusades. 18 (1): 25–65.
- Powell, James M. (1986). Anatomy of a Crusade, 1213–1221. University of Pennsylvania.
- Reynolds, Gordon M. (2024). Laywomen and the Crusade in England, 1150–1300. The Boydell Press.
- Tyerman, Christopher (1996). England and the Crusades, 1095–1588. University of Chicago Press.
- Tyerman, Christopher (2006). God's War: A New History of the Crusades. Belknap Press.
