= Hugh of Boves (knight) =

French knight

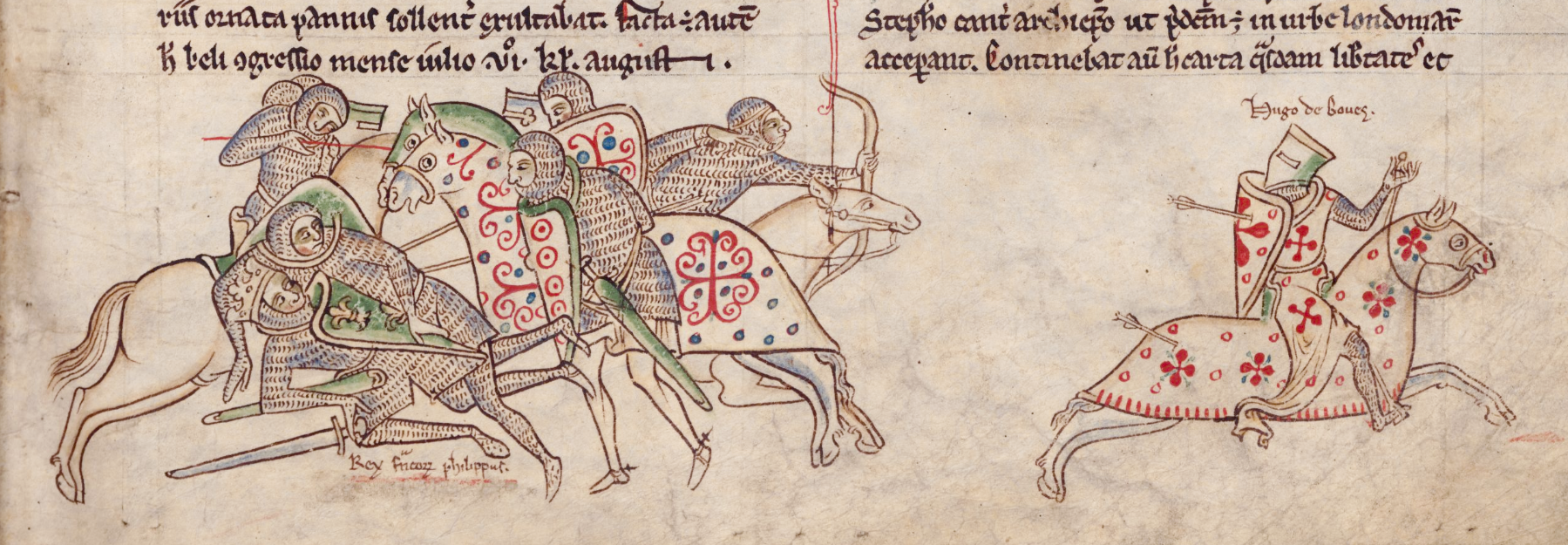
Hugh of Boves fleeing from the French at the battle of Bouvines

Hugh of Boves (died 1215) was a French nobleman and crusader, a younger son of the House of Boves.

Hugh was the third son of Lord Robert I of Boves and Beatrix of Saint-Pol. His elder brothers were Enguerrand and Robert. He joined his brothers on the Fourth Crusade. According to Geoffrey of Villehardouin, the three abandoned the main army after it laid siege to Zara in 1202. He was back in France by 1210, when he fell foul of King Philip Augustus. As a result, he joined the alliance against Philip led by King John of England.

Hugh participated in the Battle of Bouvines on the side of the allied forces. He was blamed by the English as having caused the loss of the battle by insisting that they attack the French on a Sunday which was considered unholy as it went against the will of God. He is described as being foul-tempered and wicked by the English sources. He is important because he was a powerful baron and he was the scapegoat for the allied powers as to why they lost the battle.

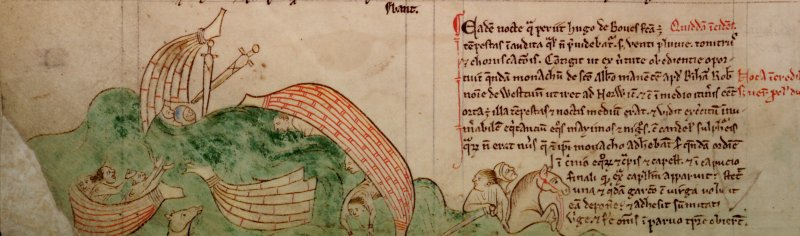
Hugh drowns in a shipwreck. Illustration from the Chronica Majora.

In the summer of 1215, Hugh was in Flanders and Brabant raising mercenaries for King John's war against the barons. He carried what he claimed were papal letters authorising the crusade indulgence for those who enlisted. Ralph of Coggeshall questioned the authenticity of these letters, although the pope did support John. According to Ralph, it was divine judgement that caused Hugh and several other ships in the mercenaries' convoy to sink in a storm while crossing the Channel. Hugh was among the drowned.

== Sources ==
- Dyson, Iain Alexander (2023). Yorkshire and the Crusades to the East, 1095–1291 (PDF) (Ph.D. diss.). University of Leeds.
- Longnon, Jean (1978). Les compagnons de Villehardouin: Recherches sur les croisés de la quatrième croisade. Geneva: Librairie Droz.
- Newman, William Mendel (1971). Les seigneurs de Nesle en Picardie (XII^{e}–XIII^{e} siècle): Recueil des Chartes. A. & J. Picard.
- Tyerman, Christopher (1996). England and the Crusades, 1095–1588. University of Chicago Press.
