= Enguerrand I de Coucy =

Medieval French nobleman

Enguerrand I (c. 1042 – 1116) was the Lord of Coucy from 1086 until his death in 1116.

Bishop Rorico of Amiens established canons at the Abbey of Saint-Acheul in 1085. The foundation charter records donations to Saint-Acheul by Count Enguerran of Boves and his vidame Eustache. It was issued in the first year of Enguerrand's rule, and praises his restoration of law and order.

Enguerrand was a man of many scandals. With the help of the Bishop of Laon he divorced his first wife, Adèle de Marle, for adultery. When he married his next wife, Sibyl of Château-Porcien, she was still married to Godfrey I, Count of Namur and Lord of Lorraine, who was absent in a war. Enguerrand and Sybil's first husband became bitter enemies and continued to fight a private war.

Adèle's son Thomas de Marle hated his father and joined the enemies against him. Nevertheless, when in 1095 the First Crusade began, both he and his son joined in the crusade as part of the army of Emicho. Thomas succeeded Enguerrand upon his death, and became a notoriously disreputable lord in his own right.

== Family ==
Enguerrand was the son of Drogo, Lord of Boves.

Enguerrand married Adèle (Ada) de Marle, the divorced wife of Aubry, Viscount of Coucy, and daughter of Letard de Roucy, Lord of Marle. Letard was, in turn, the son of Gilbert, Count of Reims and Roucy. Enguerrand and Ada had three children:

- Thomas de Marle (1073–1130/31). Lord of Coucy and Marle, Count of Amiens
- Beatrix de Boves (?−1144). Married Adam Châtelain d'Amiens
- Robert de Coucy

Enguerrand is said to have kidnapped Sibyl of Château-Porcien, the wife of Godfrey I, Count of Namur. With the kidnapped Sibyl pregnant with Enguerrand's child, he later married her and they had a daughter, Agnès de Coucy.

== Sources ==
- Ott, John S. (2015), Bishops, Authority and Community in Northwestern Europe, c.1050–1150, Cambridge University Press, ISBN 978-1-107-01781-8

Preceded by Aubry de Coucy	Lord of Coucy; 1080–1116	Succeeded by Thomas de Marle
