= Enguerrand I of Fouencamps =

Enguerrand I, called Enguerrand de Boves, was the lord of Fouencamps from 1247 until at least 1292. A member of the family of Boves, he was the son of Robert II and Marie.

Enguerrand was of age when he succeeded his father in 1247. His first act as lord is a sale to the Abbey of Notre-Dame du Paraclet recorded that year. In 1258, he sold to the Paraclete a quitrent that it owed him and a stretch of land along the Somme. In 1280, he sold the banal mill at Cayeux that held in fief from the canons of Saint-Quentin back to the canons.

Enguerrand's wife was named Jeanne and they had a daughter, Mabille, whose marriage was being planned in 1273. At some point, Enguerrand inherited from his sister, Catherine, an estate and manor at Héricourt, which he gave to Mabille. In 1292, with his permission, Mabille sold it to the Abbey of Saint-Lucien de Beauvais. Sometime later, Mabille married the jurist Philippe de Beaumanoir.

Enguerrand probably died not long after confirming the sale of Héricourt. He was succeeded by his son, Enguerrand II. It is not clear which of the two, father or son, took part in the tournament held in 1278 at Le Hem described in the Roman du Hem:

Just a brief moment after them another entered the lists, Adam de Blémur by name. Enguerran de Boves came to meet him, passionately eager to win honour. Forward he charged, thoroughly fired, helm on head and shield braced as if he and the shield were one and he'd been born so; he looked the part indeed! He let his destrier feel his spurs and they came to meet, I promise you, in so close a clash that Enguerran smashed his lance to pieces; and his opponent didn't miss: he delivered a mighty, ferocious blow—I saw it. Before they'd run their courses they'd earned the admiration of the ladies for breaking their lances in such fine style.

== Sources ==
- Bryant, Nigel, ed. (2020). The Tournaments at Le Hem and Chauvency. Boydell & Brewer.
- Feuchère, Pierre (1948). De l'épée à la plume: Les châtelains d'Arras. Imprimerie Centrale de l'Artois.
- Janvier, Auguste (1877). Boves et ses seigneurs: Étude historique sur la commune de Boves. Amiens.
- Middleton, Roger (1999). "The History of Paris BNF Fr. 1588". In Barbara N. Sargent-Baur (ed.). Le Roman de la Manekine: Edited from Paris BNF fr. 1588 and Translated. Brill. pp. 41–68.
- Petersen Dyggve, Holger (1940). "Personnages historiques figurant dans la poésie lyrique française des siècles XII^{e} et XIII^{e}, VII: La dame jolie de Fouencamp". Neuphilologische Mitteilungen. 41 (1): 12–29. JSTOR 43341238.
