= Enguerrand II of Fouencamps =

Enguerrand II (fl. 1292–1301) was the last lord of Fouencamps.

A member of the family of Boves, Enguerrand II was the son of Enguerrand I and Jeanne. It is not clear which of the two Enguerrands, father and son, took part in the tournament held in 1278 at Le Hem described in the Roman du Hem:

Just a brief moment after them another entered the lists, Adam de Blémur by name. Enguerran de Boves came to meet him, passionately eager to win honour. Forward he charged, thoroughly fired, helm on head and shield braced as if he and the shield were one and he'd been born so; he looked the part indeed! He let his destrier feel his spurs and they came to meet, I promise you, in so close a clash that Enguerran smashed his lance to pieces; and his opponent didn't miss: he delivered a mighty, ferocious blow—I saw it. Before they'd run their courses they'd earned the admiration of the ladies for breaking their lances in such fine style.

Holger Petersen Dyggve was of the opinion that it had to be Enguerrand II.

In June 1292, Enguerrand's sister Mabille sold an estate and manor at Héricourt, which their father had bestowed on her, to the Abbey of Saint-Lucien de Beauvais. Enguerrands I and II both approved the transaction. Enguerrand II probably succeeded to Fouencamps not long after the sale of Héricourt. Mabille married the jurist Philippe de Beaumanoir.

By 1298, in accordance with the "last will" of his sister, Enguerrand founded a chapel at Fouencamps in collaboration with the Abbey of Corbie. She was dead by March 1299. In 1300–1301, Enguerrand, as her heir, was trying to collect a marriage gift promised by Count Robert II of Artois back in 1273. He donated the 200 livres tournois to the Franciscans of Paris.

Enguerrand's date of death is unknown. He is not known to have descendents and the line of lords of Fouencamps ends with him. Petersen Dyggve gives his wife's name as Jeanne.

== Sources ==
- Bryant, Nigel, ed. (2020). The Tournaments at Le Hem and Chauvency. Boydell & Brewer.
- Middleton, Roger (1999). "The History of Paris BNF Fr. 1588". In Barbara N. Sargent-Baur (ed.). Le Roman de la Manekine: Edited from Paris BNF fr. 1588 and Translated. Brill. pp. 41–68.
- Petersen Dyggve, Holger (1940). "Personnages historiques figurant dans la poésie lyrique française des siècles XII^{e} et XIII^{e}, VII: La dame jolie de Fouencamp". Neuphilologische Mitteilungen. 41 (1): 12–29. JSTOR 43341238.
