= Enguerrand II de Coucy =

Enguerrand II, Lord of Coucy, known as of La Fère or of Marle, was a French nobleman. He was also lord of Marle, La Fère, Crécy (sur-Serre), Vervins, Pinon, Landouzy (la-Ville), Fontaine (lès-Vervins), and of several other places. Unlike his father, the brigand-lord Thomas de Marle, Enguerrand II peacefully administered his lands, building a chapel in his castle (the chapel's foundations survive as some of the oldest remains in Coucy). Enguerrand joined the army of Louis VII of France during the Second Crusade. He died in battle and was buried in Nazareth.

In 1131, he married Agnès de Beaugency, daughter of Raoul I of Beaugency and Mathilde de Vermandois. Agnès gave him two sons:

- Raoul I, Lord of Coucy
- Enguerrand

His main leisure pursuit was hunting in the woods, where legend holds he met and killed a fierce lion or beast which had been terrorising the area, and founded the Order of the Lion to commemorate the event.

Preceded by Thomas de Marle	Lord of Coucy; 1130–1149 (?)	Succeeded by Raoul I, Lord of Coucy
