= Guy II of Montlhéry =

Guy II of Montlhéry may refer to:

- Guy II the Red of Rochefort (d. 1108), son of Guy I of Montlhéry
- Guy III of Montlhéry (d. 1109), called Guy Trousseau, son of Milo I of Montlhéry
