= Robert I of Fouencamps =

Robert I (died c. 1227), known as Robert of Boves, was the first lord of Fouencamps from 1191 until his death. He played an important role in the Fourth Crusade.

A member of the family of Boves, Robert was a middle son of Robert I of Boves and Beatrice of Saint-Pol. He married a woman named Marie. A document of 1201 lists their three sons: Robert II, Thomas and Hellin. A document of 1202 mentions a daughter named Beatrice.

Robert is mentioned in the cartulary of the Abbey of Saint-Fuscien for 1190. His father died in 1191. According to a document issued in 1191 by the bishop of Amiens, Thibault d'Heilly, Robert collected the tithes of the villages of Rainneville and Moyenneville. He was the first of the line of lords of Fouencamps, a cadet branch of the family of Boves. He is mentioned in a document of 1192 issued by his elder brother, Enguerrand II, who inherited Boves.

In 1202, in preparation for the Fourth Crusade, Robert made donations to the church of Saint-Quentin, the church of Fouilloy and the abbey of Corbie. During the crusade, Robert, representing a faction of crusaders opposed to the helping Venice conquer Zara, rode up to the walls of Zara and convinced the citizens not to yield. Robert's attitude to the attack on Zara at first was not as strong as that of his brothers, Enguerrand and Hugh. He was one of four delegates sent to Rome in December 1202 to seek absolution for the crusaders' attack on Zara. According to Geoffrey of Villehardouin, he completed his task and sailed for Acre without returning to the army as promised. He was the first of the brothers to defect.

Robert remained in the Levant for a long time. He eventually made his way to the Latin Empire. In the army of the Emperor Henry at the capture of Larissa in 1209, he distinguished himself as the first to cross the bridge. He may have returned to France later that year. He is recorded back in France in 1210. He was part of the delegation that informed Henry's sister Yolanda and her husband Peter of their election as empress and emperor. He was in Rome on 11 March 1217 to attend their coronation and to witness the confirmation of the constitutional treaties of 1204–1205. In April, he was a witness when Peter confirmed the Kingdom of Thessalonica to Marquis William VI of Montferrat.

In 1219, Robert made a donation to Enguerrand's recent monastic foundation, the Abbey of Notre-Dame du Paraclet. He is also recorded in France in 1222. In April 1226, he made a donation to the church of Amiens. By July 1228, he was dead. His son Robert II succeeded him as lord of Fouencamps.

== Sources ==
- Angold, Michael (2014) [2003]. The Fourth Crusade: Event and Context. Routledge.
- Janvier, Auguste (1877). Boves et ses seigneurs: Étude historique sur la commune de Boves. Amiens.
- Longnon, Jean (1978). Les compagnons de Villehardouin: Recherches sur les croisés de la quatrième croisade. Librairie Droz.
- Newman, William Mendel (1971). Les seigneurs de Nesle en Picardie (XII^{e}–XIII^{e} siècle): Recueil des Chartes. A. & J. Picard.
- Petersen Dyggve, Holger (1940). "Personnages historiques figurant dans la poésie lyrique française des siècles XII^{e} et XIII^{e}, VII: La dame jolie de Fouencamp". Neuphilologische Mitteilungen. 41 (1): 12–29. JSTOR 43341238.
- Phillips, Jonathan P. (2005). The Fourth Crusade and the Sack of Constantinople. Pimlico.
- Queller, D. E.; Compton, T. K.; Campbell, D. A. (1974). "The Fourth Crusade: The Neglected Majority". Speculum. 49 (3): 441–465. doi:10.2307/2851751. JSTOR 2851751. S2CID 163442765.
- Queller, Donald E.; Madden, Thomas F. (1997). The Fourth Crusade: The Conquest of Constantinople (2nd rev. ed.). University of Pennsylvania Press.
- Van Tricht, Filip (2011). The Latin Renovatio of Byzantium: The Empire of Constantinople (1204–1228). Leiden: Brill. ISBN 978-90-04-20323-5.
