= Siege of Zara =

Part of the Fourth Crusade

- Part of the Fourth Crusade
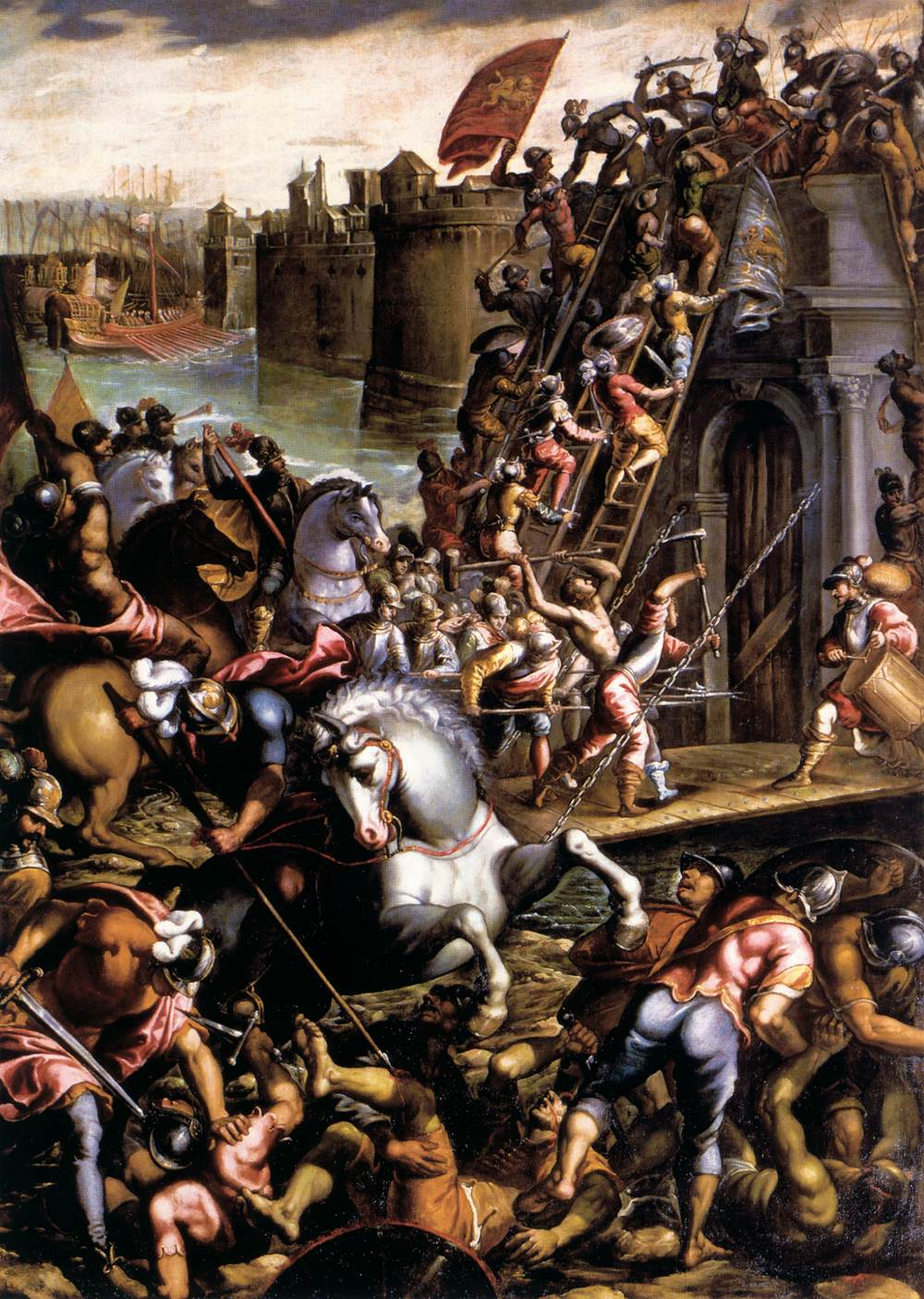
- The crusaders conquering the City of Zara (Zadar) in 1202, painted by Andrea Vicentino
Date	10 November – 24 November 1202
Location	City of Zadar (Zara), Kingdom of Croatia 44°06′51″N 15°13′40″E
Result	Crusader-Venetian victory

Belligerents
Crusaders; Republic of Venice	Kingdom of Hungary; Kingdom of Croatia

Commanders and leaders
Enrico Dandolo	Unknown

Strength
Crusaders: 10,000 men Venetians: 10,000 men and 210 ships	Unknown
- Location within Croatia Siege of Zara (Mediterranean)

The siege of Zara or siege of Zadar (Croatian: opsada Zadra; Hungarian: Zára ostroma; 10–24 November 1202) was the first major action of the Fourth Crusade and the first attack against a Catholic city by Catholic crusaders. The crusaders had an agreement with Venice for transport across the sea, but the price far exceeded what they were able to pay. Venice set the condition that the crusaders help them capture Zadar (or Zara), a constant battleground between Venice on one side and the Kingdom of Croatia and Dalmatia (Sclavonia) and Hungary on the other, whose king, Emeric, pledged himself to join the Crusade. Although some of the crusaders refused to take part in the siege, the attack on Zadar began in November 1202 despite letters from Pope Innocent III forbidding such an action and threatening excommunication. Zadar fell on 24 November and the Venetians and the crusaders sacked the city. After wintering in Zadar, the Fourth Crusade continued its campaign, which led to the siege of Constantinople.

== Background ==
Shortly after his election as pope in 1198, Pope Innocent III (1161–1216) published several papal encyclicals calling for the invasion and recapture of the Holy Land from the Muslims. His plan to accomplish this differed from the earlier ultimately unsuccessful Second and Third crusades in several ways. Instead of the secular nobles who led the earlier crusades, this one would be, in theory, completely under papal control. Innocent's plan also called for the invading armies to travel to Egypt by sea and seize the Nile Delta, which would then be used as a base from which to invade Palestine. His call was at first poorly received among the ruling families of Europe, but by 1200, an army of approximately 35,000 was pledged.

Innocent III negotiated an agreement with the Republic of Venice, Europe's dominant sea power at the time, involving the construction of a fleet of warships and transports. The deal stipulated that about 35,000 crusaders would need transport and the Venetians would be paid 94,000 marks of silver, to be paid in installments. A council held at Soissons in June 1201 chose Boniface of Montferrat to lead the expedition.

On the eve of the feast of Saint Martin, they arrived before Zara in Sclavonia and saw the city fortified with lofty walls and tall towers; you would have sought a finer, stronger, more impressive city in vain. And when the pilgrims saw it they were greatly astounded and said to one another, "How could such a city be taken by force, unless God Himself brought it about?"

— Joinville and Villehardouin (Translated by Margaret Shaw), Chronicles of the Crusades

The agreement between the Venetians and the crusaders had set the date for the arrival of the host in Venice before the end of April 1202, in order to provide for a departure in time for a summer crossing at the end of June. The crusade leaders had counted on raising the money still owed to the Venetians through the collection of passage money from the individual crusaders. However, the first crusader groups did not leave France until April and May, others straggled along throughout the summer and some of the French nobles chose to sail instead from Marseilles and other ports. Therefore, after the Venetians had suspended their regular commercial operations for a year to build and crew the ships, only about 12,000 crusaders showed up at Venice to man and pay for them. Boniface and the nobles added what money they could spare, and pledged their gold and silver plate to the Venetian moneylenders. Still the crusaders found themselves only able to pay 51,000 marks to the Venetians. In response, the Venetians indicated that they would accept the invasion of Zara (now Zadar, Croatia), a Catholic city on the coast of the Adriatic, as well as nearby Trieste, in lieu of payment for the time being; the crusaders were then to pay the rest owed to the Venetians out of their initial gains in the crusade. Zara had rebelled against the Venetian Republic in 1183, and placed itself under the dual protection of the Papacy and King Emeric of Hungary (who had recently agreed to join the Crusade). Though a large group of crusaders found the scheme repulsive and refused to participate, the majority agreed (despite the written protests of Innocent III), citing it as necessary to attain the larger goal of taking Jerusalem.

== Assault ==
Once the agreement was made, the crusaders and Venetians began boarding the ships. The crusaders used the 50 amphibious transports, 100 horse carriers and 60 warships designed and built for them by the Venetians. Their transports were approximately 30 m long, 9 m wide and 12 m high, with a crew of 100. Each one could carry up to 600 infantry. The horse carriers featured specially designed slings to carry their cargo of horses, and featured fold-out ramps below the waterline that could be opened to allow mounted knights to charge directly onto shore. The Venetian warships were powered by 100 oarsmen each and featured metal-tipped rams just above the waterline as their primary weapons. They also carried more than 300 siege weapons.

The Venetian fleet, led by Doge Enrico Dandolo, left harbor on 1 October towards Istria and imposed Venetian supremacy over Trieste, Muggia and Pula. Most of the crusader forces left Venice on 8 October. The two armies met near Pula and sailed together towards Zadar. Doge Dandolo was in no hurry as he planned on staying in Zadar over winter.

On the eve of St. Martin's Day the fleet arrived at Zadar. The attack on Zadar took the form of an amphibious landing followed by a brief siege. Chains and booms were laid across the mouth of Zadar's harbor as a defense, but the crusaders burst through them in their Venetian ships and landed their troops and equipment near the city, where they made a camp. Citizens of Zadar hung flags with crosses on the walls, showing that they were a Christian city. Some of the crusader leaders, including Simon de Montfort, Robert de Boves and Guy of Vaux-de-Cernay, refused to take part in the siege and requested that the city be spared. On behalf of the Pope, Guy of Vaux-de-Cernay read a letter delivered by Peter of Lucedio and forbade the conquest of the city "because it is a city of Christians, and you are pilgrims". However, most of the crusaders sided with Dandolo, while de Montfort and other crusaders who refused to participate in the siege camped further away from the city.

On 13 November siege engines were placed and used to bombard the city's walls. Zadar fell on 24 November 1202, and the incident foreshadowed the siege of Constantinople later in the campaign. Most of the population of Zadar fled to Nin and Biograd or the surrounding islands.

== Aftermath ==
Following the capture of the city, widespread violence erupted between the Frankish and Venetian contingents over the distribution of plunder. The anonymous author of the Devastatio Constantinopolitana records a figure of 100 dead following the brawl.

According to Geoffrey of Villehardouin, "the army spent the whole of that winter in Zara [...] During this time many men from the lower ranks deserted and escaped in merchant ships [...] About five hundred of them got away in one ship, but all of them lost their lives by drowning. Another group escaped by land, thinking to travel safely through Sclavonia; but the people of that country attacked them, killing a great number, and those who were left came flying back to the army".

In 1203, Pope Innocent III excommunicated the entire crusading army, along with the Venetians, for taking part in the attack, writing:

Behold your gold has turned into base metal and your silver has almost completely rusted since, departing from the purity of your plan and turning aside from the path onto the impassable road, you have, so to speak, withdrawn your hand from the plough [...] for when [...] you should have hastened to the land flowing with milk and honey, you turned away, going astray in the direction of the desert.

In February 1203, the Pope rescinded the excommunications against all non-Venetians in the expedition.

== Sources ==
- Christian vs. Christian in the Fourth Crusade: Quarterly Journal of Military History
- Gibbon, Edward. History of the Decline and Fall of the Roman Empire, Ch. 60: Siege of Zara
