= Héricourt-sur-Thérain =

- Commune
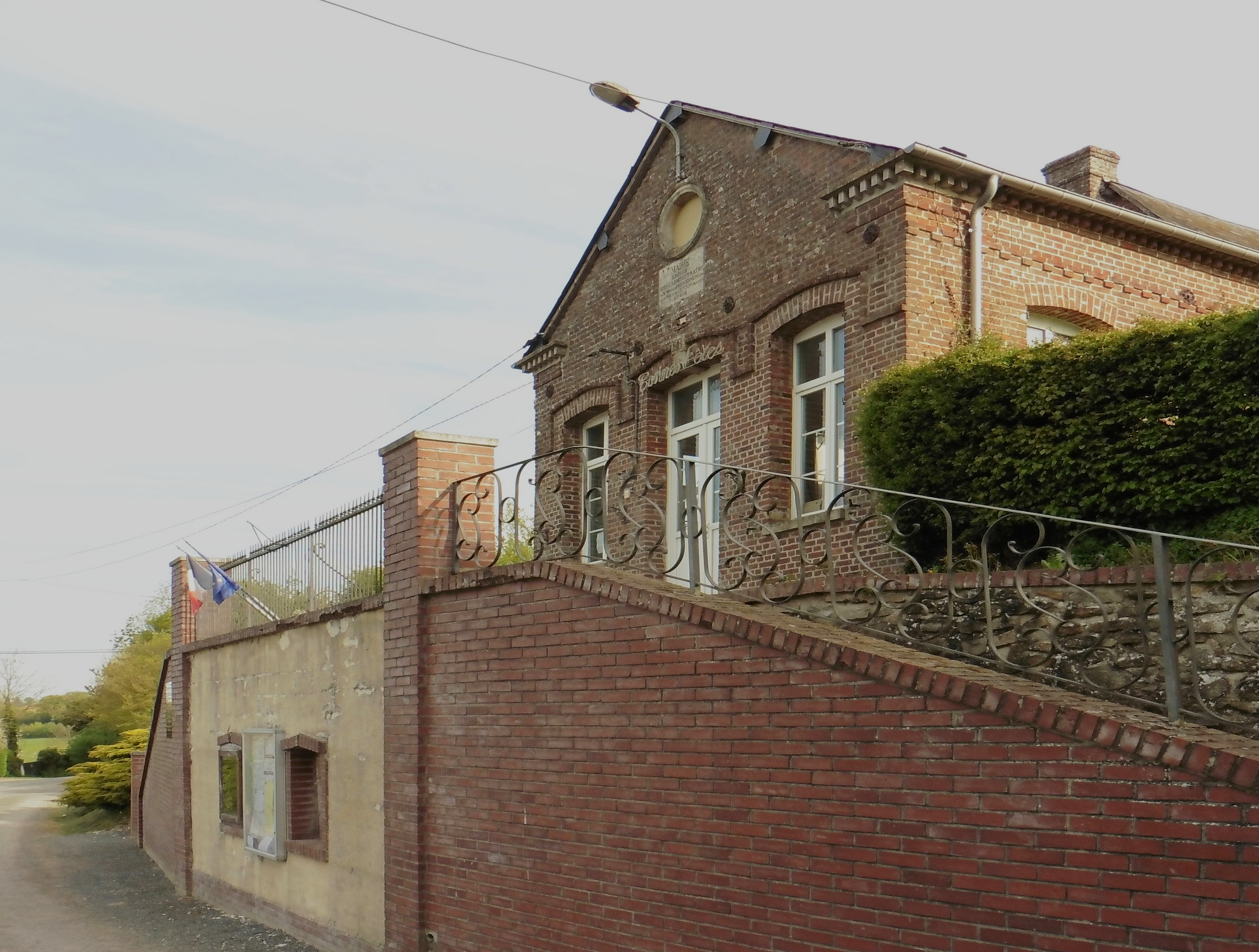
- The town hall in Héricourt-sur-Thérain
- Location of Héricourt-sur-Thérain
- Location within France Location within Hauts-de-France
- Coordinates: 49°34′59″N 1°45′41″E
- Country: France
- Region: Hauts-de-France
- Department: Oise
- Arrondissement: Beauvais
- Canton: Grandvilliers
- Intercommunality: Picardie Verte

Government
  - Mayor (2020–2026): Jacky Paris
- Area^{1}: 4.35 km^{2} (1.68 sq mi)
- Elevation: 150 m (490 ft)
- Highest elevation: 209 m (686 ft)
- Lowest elevation: 137 m (449 ft)
- Population (2023): 113
  - Density: 26.0/km^{2} (67.3/sq mi)
- Time zone: UTC+01:00 (CET)
  - Summer (DST): UTC+02:00 (CEST)
- INSEE/Postal code: 60312 /60380
- ^{1} French Land Register data, which excludes lakes, ponds, glaciers > 1 km^{2} (0.386 sq mi or 247 acres) and river estuaries.

Héricourt-sur-Thérain (French pronunciation: [eʁikuʁ syʁ teʁɛ̃], literally Héricourt on Thérain) is a commune in the Oise department in northern France.

== See also ==
- Communes of the Oise department
