= Alfred J. Andrea =

American historian and medievalist

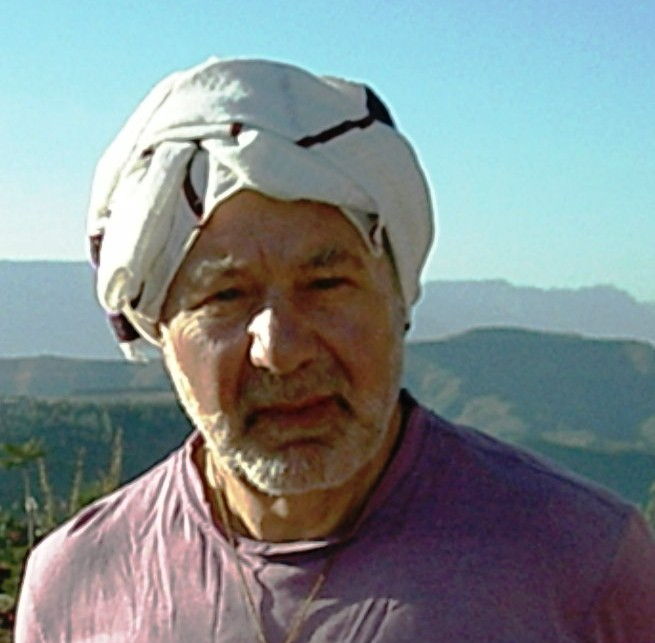
- Born: Alfred John Andrea; 18 November 1941 (age 84)
- Occupation: Historian
- Awards: Fellow of the Alexander von Humboldt Foundation

Academic background
- Education: Boston College; Cornell University

Academic work
- Institutions: University of Vermont; University of the Peloponnese; University of Puget Sound; Keimyung University
- Notable works: The Capture of Constantinople (1997); Encyclopedia of the Crusades (2003)

Alfred John Andrea (born November 18, 1941) is an American historian of medieval and world history.

He is professor emeritus of History at the University of Vermont, former president of the World History Association, professor honoris causa at the University of the Peloponnese in Greece, and Distinguished Professor at the Keimyung University in Korea.

His scholarship has focused on the crusades, papal–Byzantine relations, the Silk Road, and the historiography of world history. He has been a fellow of the Alexander von Humboldt Foundation since 1965.

== Biography ==
Andrea was born on November 18, 1941. He received his A.B. magna cum laude from Boston College in 1963 and earned his Ph.D. in history from Cornell University in 1969, with a dissertation titled Pope Innocent III as Crusader and Canonist: His Relations with the Greeks of Constantinople, 1198–1216.

Andrea joined the faculty of the University of Vermont in 1967, where he taught until 2001, rising from assistant to full professor and holding administrative roles including Director of Graduate Studies, Interim Chair, and Director of Undergraduate Studies.

He later held visiting and honorary appointments at institutions in the United States, Europe, and Asia, among them the Eli Lilly Visiting Professorship at the University of Puget Sound (1978–1979) and a Distinguished Scholar-in-Residence position at the University of Louisville (2002).

He also served as a President of World History Association from 2010 to 2012.

His awards include the World History Association’s Pioneer of World History Award (2014), the Phi Delta Kappa Award for Distinguished Teaching (2009), and the Centennial Medal for Distinguished Scholarship from Saint Michael’s College (2004). He has been a fellow of the Alexander von Humboldt Foundation since 1965.

On 19 October 2022, the University of the Peloponnese in Kalamata, Greece, conferred upon him the title of professor honoris causa in recognition of his contributions to the study of the Crusades and world history. On 3 November 2022, the Academia Via Serica at Keimyung University in Daegu, South Korea, named him Distinguished Professor for his scholarship on the Silk Road.

== Research and scholarly work ==
Andrea’s research spans medieval ecclesiastical history, the crusades, papal–Byzantine relations, and long-distance cultural exchange in the premodern world.

His work integrates regional and global perspectives, particularly cross-cultural encounters along the Silk Roads and in the Mediterranean.

His annotated source collection Contemporary Sources for the Fourth Crusade (Brill, 1997; 2nd ed., 2009) remains a standard reference in crusader studies, and The Capture of Constantinople (1997) provides a critical analysis and translation of Gunther of Pairis’s Hystoria Constantinopolitana. He authored the Encyclopedia of the Crusades (2003) and served as editor-in-chief of the 21-volume World History Encyclopedia (2011).

In world history pedagogy, Andrea co-authored with James H. Overfield anthology The Human Record: Sources of Global History (first published in 1990; 8th ed., 2015) and authored The Medieval Record: Sources of Medieval History (2nd rev. ed., 2019), which he regards as a personal favorite. He also co-edited Seven Myths of the Crusades (2015) with Andrew Holt and coauthored Sanctified Violence: Holy War in World History (2021), and authored Expanding Horizons: The Globalization of Medieval Europe, 450–1500 (2024).

== Selected publications ==
=== Books and reference works ===
- Andrea, Alfred J. (2024). Expanding horizons: the globalization of Medieval Europe, 450-1500. Critical Themes in World History. Indianapolis: Hackett Publishing Company, Incorporated. ISBN 978-1-64792-183-5.
- Andrea, Alfred J.; Holt, Andrew P. (2021). Sanctified violence: holy war in world history. Critical themes in world history. Indianapolis, Indiana: Hackett Publishing Company, Inc. ISBN 978-1-62466-960-6.
- Andrea, Alfred J.; Holt, Andrew, eds. (2015). Seven myths of the Crusades. Myths of history : a Hackett series. Indianapolis: Hackett Publishing Company, Inc. ISBN 978-1-62466-403-8.
- Andrea, Alfred J.; Overfield, James H. (2016), The human record. Volume 1: To 1500 (8th ed.), Boston: Cengage Learning, ISBN 978-1-285-87023-6
- Andrea, Alfred; Andrea, Alfred; Whalen, Brett (2000-06-16). Contemporary Sources for the Fourth Crusade. BRILL. ISBN 978-90-474-3383-5.
- Gunther; Andrea, Alfred J. (1997). The capture of Constantinople: the Hystoria Constantinopolitana of Gunther of Pairis. Middle Ages series. Philadelphia: University of Pennsylvania Press. ISBN 978-0-8122-3356-8.
- Andrea, Alfred J.; Schmokel, Wolfe W., eds. (1975). The living past: Western historiographical traditions. New York: Wiley. ISBN 978-0-471-02914-4.
- Andrea, Alfred J.; Neel, Carolyn, eds. (2011). World history encyclopedia. Santa Barbara, Calif: ABC-CLIO. ISBN 978-1-85109-929-0.
- Andrea, Alfred J. (2003). Encyclopedia of the crusades. Westport, Conn: Greenwood Press. ISBN 978-0-313-31659-3.
