= Boves, Somme =

Boves
- Commune
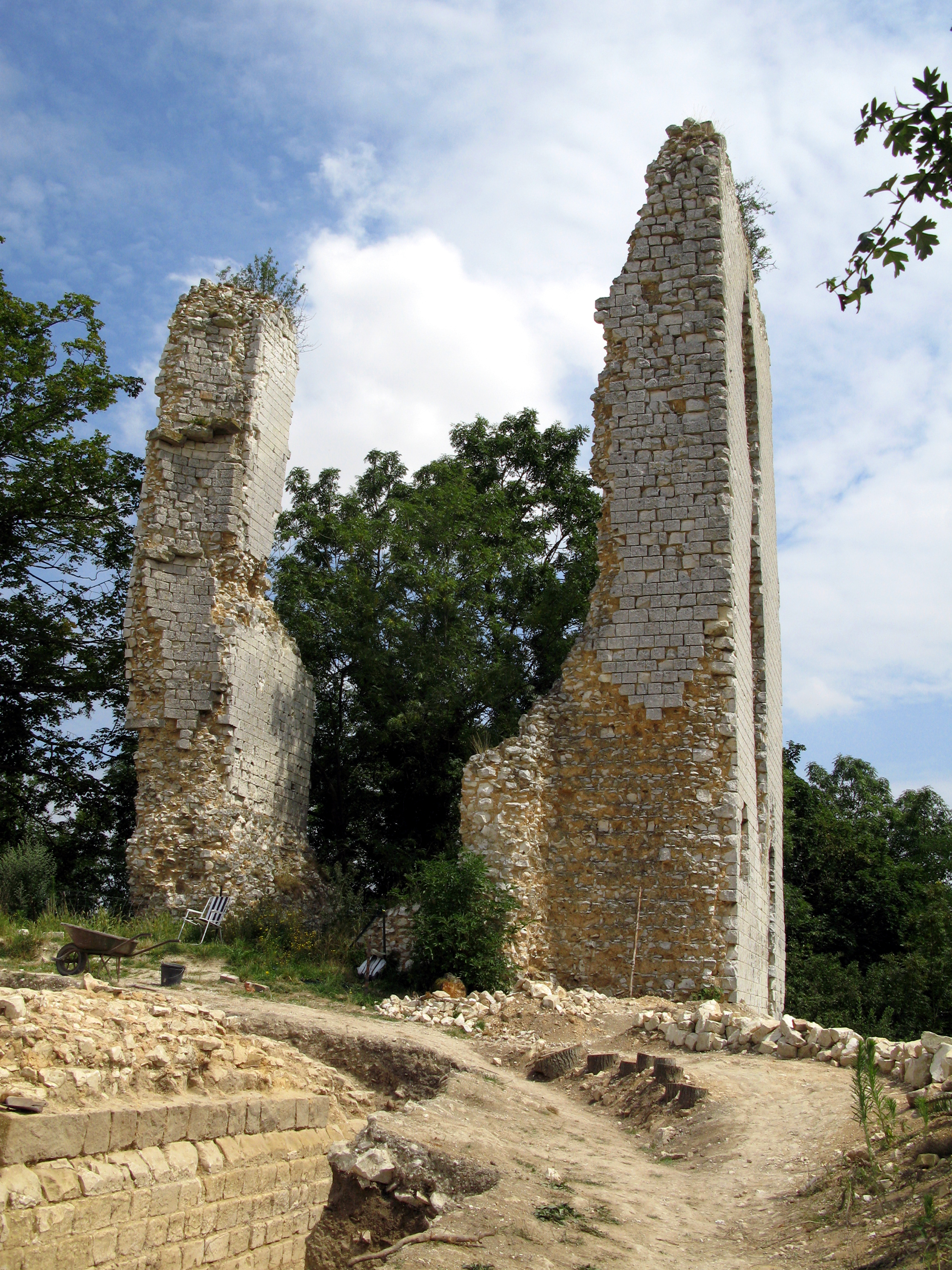
- Boves château ruins

- Coat of arms
- Location of Boves
- Location within France Location within Hauts-de-France
- Coordinates: 49°50′46″N 2°23′30″E
- Country: France
- Region: Hauts-de-France
- Department: Somme
- Arrondissement: Amiens
- Canton: Amiens-5
- Intercommunality: Amiens Métropole

Government
  - Mayor (2020–2026): Maryse Vandepitte
- Area^{1}: 25.37 km^{2} (9.80 sq mi)
- Elevation: 28 m (92 ft)
- Highest elevation: 110 m (360 ft)
- Lowest elevation: 22 m (72 ft)
- Population (2023): 3,234
  - Density: 127.5/km^{2} (330.2/sq mi)
- Time zone: UTC+01:00 (CET)
  - Summer (DST): UTC+02:00 (CEST)
- INSEE/Postal code: 80131 /80440
- ^{1} French Land Register data, which excludes lakes, ponds, glaciers > 1 km^{2} (0.386 sq mi or 247 acres) and river estuaries.

Boves (French pronunciation: [bɔv]; Picard: Bofe) is a commune in the Somme department in Hauts-de-France in northern France.

== Geography ==
Boves is situated on the D935 and D116 road junction, on the banks of the river Avre, some 5 miles (8 km) southeast of Amiens. Boves station has rail connections to Amiens, Compiègne and Creil.

== Population ==
Historical population
Year	Pop.	±% p.a.
1968	1,995	—
1975	2,266	+1.84%
1982	3,146	+4.80%
1990	2,964	−0.74%
1999	2,786	−0.69%
2007	2,814	+0.13%
2012	3,100	+1.95%
2017	3,192	+0.59%
2023	3,234	+0.22%
Source: INSEE

== History ==
- c640 : The birthplace of Saint Godeberta
- c1166 : The birthplace of medieval author Jean de Boves.
- July 1185 : Philippe-Auguste signed the treaty acquiring part of Picardy.
- August 1835 : Victor Hugo visited the ruins of the château.

== Places of interest ==
- Ruins of the fortified 12th-century château
- Notre-Dame de la Nativité church
- Saint-Ladre marshland nature reserve

== See also ==
- Communes of the Somme department
