= Kallnach =

- Municipality
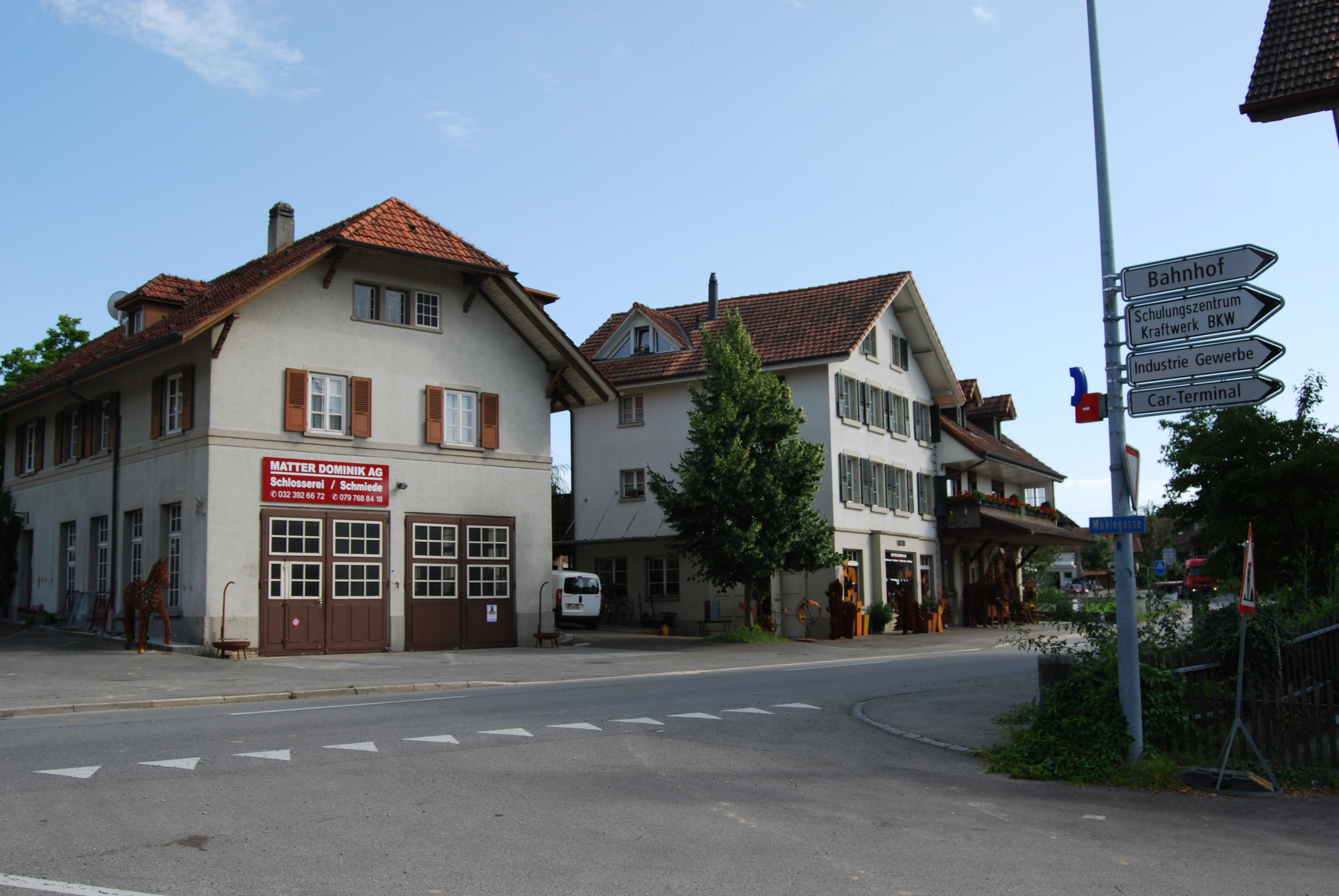

- Flag Coat of arms
- Location of Kallnach
- Location within Switzerland Location within Canton of Bern
- Coordinates: 47°1′N 7°14′E
- Country: Switzerland
- Canton: Bern
- District: Seeland

Area
  - Total: 10.66 km^{2} (4.12 sq mi)
- Elevation: 445 m (1,460 ft)

Population (December 2020)
  - Total: 2,220
  - Density: 208/km^{2} (539/sq mi)
- Time zone: UTC+01:00 (CET)
  - Summer (DST): UTC+02:00 (CEST)
- Postal code: 3283
- SFOS number: 304
- ISO 3166 code: CH-BE
- Surrounded by: Bargen, Finsterhennen, Fräschels (FR), Kerzers (FR), Niederried bei Kallnach, Siselen, Treiten
- Website: kallnach.ch

Kallnach (French: Chouchignies) is a municipality in the Seeland administrative district in the canton of Bern in Switzerland. On 1 January 2019 the former municipality of Golaten merged into the municipality of Kallnach.

== History ==
Aerial view (1954)

Kallnach is first mentioned in 1231 as apud Calnachon.

Kallnach was the site of a Bronze Age foundry as well as a small Roman era settlement or way station. The Roman road from Aventicum to Augusta Raurica or Vindonissa passed through Kallnach. A graveyard in Bergwegs indicates that the area was inhabited during the Early Middle Ages. In 1231 the Kyburg ministerialis (unfree knights in the service of a feudal overlord) family of Oltigen and the monasteries of Frauenkappelen, Frienisberg and Tedlingen all owned property in Kallnach. The ministerialis family of Schüpfen held the low justice right in Kallnach and Niederried. These properties and rights passed through a number of families until Bern bought the village in 1521–22 and incorporated it into the bailiwick of Aarberg.

The village church was built in 1608 over the ruins of an earlier, medieval chapel.

The village periodically flooded when the nearby Grosses Moos marsh flooded. The Jura water correction projects of 1868–91, 1933–36 and 1964–71 helped to end the flooding. The swampy land around the village was replaced with rich farm land that is now intensively farmed. In 1909–12 a hydroelectric power plant was built on the Aare river near Kallnach. The plant was expanded in 1978–80 and remains a major employer in the municipality. The Broyetal railroad (build in 1876) and the Lyss-Kallnach-Murten road allowed the village to grow. In the second half of the 20th century created the new housing developments of Krähenberg (1949), Rebe and Ammengasse (1970–80) were built to house the growing population.

== Geography ==
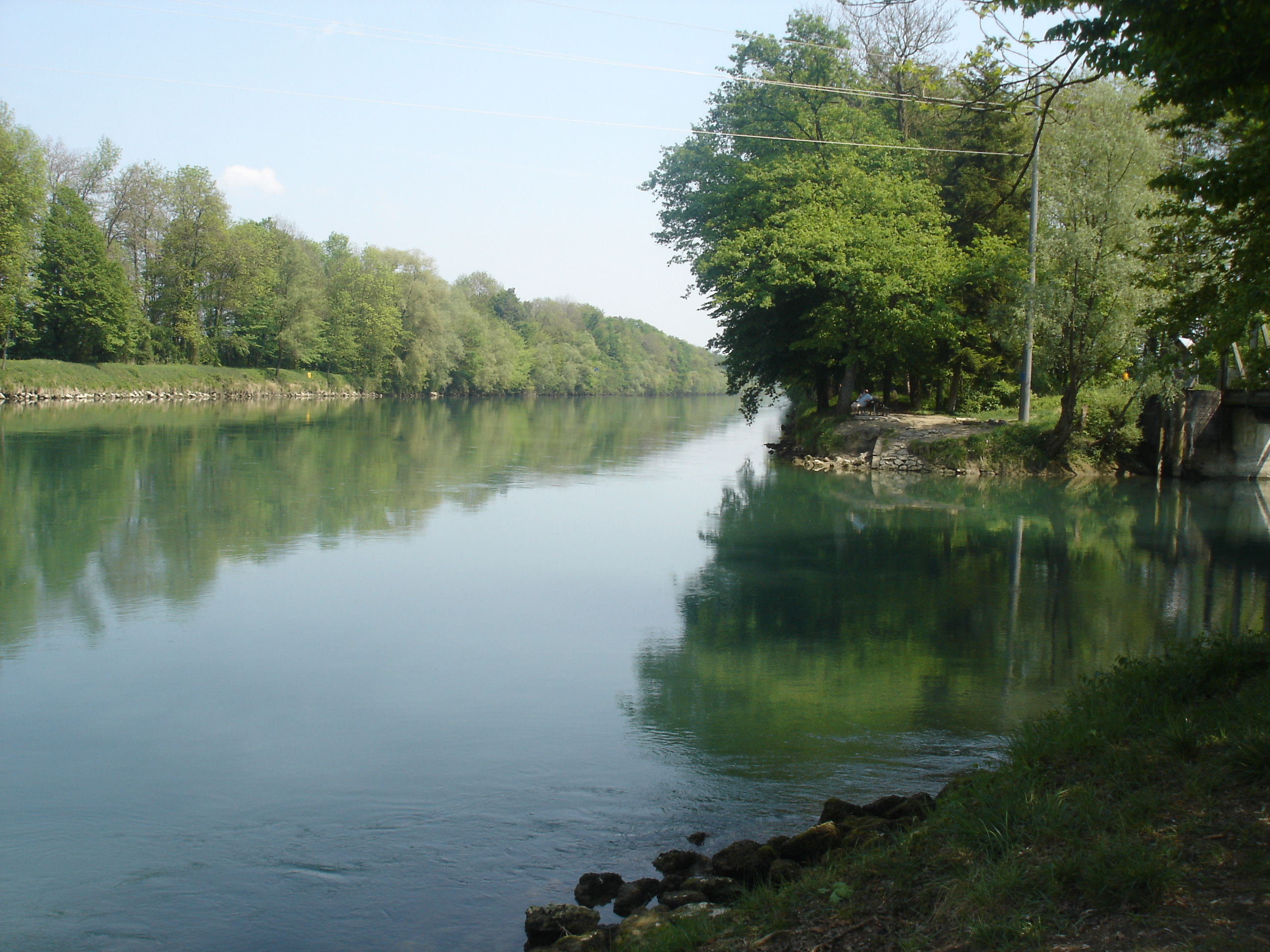
Hagneck Canal near Kallnach

Kallnach has an area of 15.19 km^{2} (5.86 sq mi). Of this area, 8.05 km^{2} (3.11 mi^{2}) or 75.5% is used for agricultural purposes, while 1.34 km^{2} (0.52 mi^{2}) or 12.6% is forested. Of the rest of the land, 0.96 km^{2} (0.37 mi^{2}) or 9.0% is settled (buildings or roads), 0.21 km^{2} (0.081 mi^{2}) or 2.0% is either rivers or lakes and 0.06 km^{2} (15 acres) or 0.6% is unproductive land.

Of the built up area, housing and buildings made up 3.9% and transportation infrastructure made up 3.6%. Out of the forested land, 11.4% of the total land area is heavily forested and 1.2% is covered with orchards or small clusters of trees. Of the agricultural land, 67.4% is used for growing crops and 6.5% is pastures, while 1.7% is used for orchards or vine crops. All the water in the municipality is flowing water.

The municipality is located on the eastern edge of the Grosses Moos marsh between the Aare river and the Hagneck Canal. It consists of the linear village of Kallnach.

The municipalities of Kallnach and Niederried bei Kallnach are considering a merger on 1 January 2013 where Kallnach will absorb Niederried.

== Coat of arms ==
The blazon of the municipal coat of arms is Azure a clapper Argent between two mullets Or.

== Demographics ==
Kallnach has a population (as of December 2020) of 2,220. As of 2010, 8.4% of the population are resident foreign nationals. Over the last 10 years (2000–2010) the population has changed at a rate of 2.1%. Migration accounted for 3.8%, while births and deaths accounted for −2%.

Most of the population (as of 2000) speaks German (1,416 or 96.0%) as their first language, Albanian is the second most common (15 or 1.0%) and French is the third (12 or 0.8%). There are 7 people who speak Italian and 1 person who speaks Romansh.

As of 2008, the population was 50.1% male and 49.9% female. The population was made up of 698 Swiss men (45.3% of the population) and 74 (4.8%) non-Swiss men. There were 714 Swiss women (46.3%) and 5 (0.3%) non-Swiss women. Of the population in the municipality, 601 or about 40.7% were born in Kallnach and lived there in 2000. There were 551 or 37.4% who were born in the same canton, while 172 or 11.7% were born somewhere else in Switzerland, and 114 or 7.7% were born outside of Switzerland.

As of 2000, children and teenagers (0–19 years old) make up 25.9% of the population, while adults (20–64 years old) make up 58.6% and seniors (over 64 years old) make up 15.5%.

As of 2000, there were 615 people who were single and never married in the municipality. There were 750 married individuals, 71 widows or widowers and 39 individuals who are divorced.

As of 2000, there were 581 private households in the municipality, and an average of 2.5 persons per household. There were 163 households that consist of only one person and 49 households with five or more people. In 2000, a total of 556 apartments (92.5% of the total) were permanently occupied, while 25 apartments (4.2%) were seasonally occupied and 20 apartments (3.3%) were empty. As of 2009, the construction rate of new housing units was 6.5 new units per 1000 residents. The vacancy rate for the municipality, in 2010, was 1.05%.

The historical population is given in the following chart:

== Sights ==
The entire region around the power plant at Kallnach is designated as part of the Inventory of Swiss Heritage Sites.

Kallnach is considered the longest Straßendorf (a village that lies almost entirely along a single road) in Switzerland. It stretches along the foot of a moraine of the Rhône Glacier at the edge of the Grosses Moos. It lies on the road from Lyss through Aarberg to Kerzers. It has a train station on the Broyetal Line (which connects Aarberg and Kerzers).

The remains of a Roman road which connected the settlements of Aventicum and Petinesca have been found in the Aspi. Excavations in 1989 revealed remains which have been variously interpreted as a restaurant, a customs office, or a horse-changing station. In the seventh century, Romans still lived in the area of today's Kallnach, as evidenced by their remains and graves.

== Politics ==
In the 2007 federal election the most popular party was the SVP which received 47.61% of the vote. The next three most popular parties were the SPS (17.84%), the FDP (10.37%) and the Green Party (9.24%). In the federal election, a total of 501 votes were cast, and the voter turnout was 44.6%.

== Economy ==
As of 2010, Kallnach had an unemployment rate of 1%. As of 2008, there were 99 people employed in the primary economic sector and about 39 businesses involved in this sector. 144 people were employed in the secondary sector and there were 19 businesses in this sector. 389 people were employed in the tertiary sector, with 38 businesses in this sector.

In 2008 the total number of full-time equivalent jobs was 524. The number of jobs in the primary sector was 67, of which 66 were in agriculture and 1 was in forestry or lumber production. The number of jobs in the secondary sector was 133 of which 78 or (58.6%) were in manufacturing and 55 (41.4%) were in construction. The number of jobs in the tertiary sector was 324. In the tertiary sector; 65 or 20.1% were in wholesale or retail sales or the repair of motor vehicles, 192 or 59.3% were in the movement and storage of goods, 14 or 4.3% were in a hotel or restaurant, 10 or 3.1% were technical professionals or scientists, 13 or 4.0% were in education and 9 or 2.8% were in health care.

In 2000, there were 341 workers who commuted into the municipality and 484 workers who commuted away. The municipality is a net exporter of workers, with about 1.4 workers leaving the municipality for every one entering. Of the working population, 11.7% used public transportation to get to work, and 57.3% used a private car.

== Religion ==
From the 2000 census, 96 or 6.5% were Roman Catholic, while 1,206 or 81.8% belonged to the Swiss Reformed Church. Of the rest of the population, there were 3 members of an Orthodox church (or about 0.20% of the population), there were 2 individuals (or about 0.14% of the population) who belonged to the Christian Catholic Church, and there were 56 individuals (or about 3.80% of the population) who belonged to another Christian church. There were 51 (or about 3.46% of the population) who were Islamic. There were 5 individuals who were Buddhist and 1 individual who belonged to another church. 53 (or about 3.59% of the population) belonged to no church, are agnostic or atheist, and 30 individuals (or about 2.03% of the population) did not answer the question.

== Education ==
In Kallnach about 622 or (42.2%) of the population have completed non-mandatory upper secondary education, and 129 or (8.7%) have completed additional higher education (either university or a Fachhochschule). Of the 129 who completed tertiary schooling, 76.7% were Swiss men, 20.9% were Swiss women.

The Canton of Bern school system provides one year of non-obligatory Kindergarten, followed by six years of Primary school. This is followed by three years of obligatory lower Secondary school where the students are separated according to ability and aptitude. Following the lower Secondary students may attend additional schooling or they may enter an apprenticeship.

During the 2009–10 school year, there were a total of 147 students attending classes in Kallnach. There was one kindergarten class with a total of 18 students in the municipality. Of the kindergarten students, 5.6% were permanent or temporary residents of Switzerland (not citizens) and 5.6% have a different mother language than the classroom language. The municipality had 5 primary classes and 96 students. Of the primary students, 9.4% were permanent or temporary residents of Switzerland (not citizens) and 6.3% have a different mother language than the classroom language. During the same year, there were 2 lower secondary classes with a total of 33 students. There were 3.0% who were permanent or temporary residents of Switzerland (not citizens) and 6.1% have a different mother language than the classroom language. As of 2000, there were 18 students in Kallnach who came from another municipality, while 79 residents attended schools outside the municipality.

Kallnach is home to the Kultur- und Bibliotheksverein Kallnach und Niederried library (shared between Kallnach and Niederried). The library has (as of 2008) 6,491 books or other media, and loaned out 4,404 items in the same year. It was open a total of 169 days with average of 7.5 hours per week during that year.

== Transportation ==
The municipality has a railway station, Kallnach, on the Palézieux–Lyss line. It has regular service to Kerzers and Lyss.
