= Radelfingen =

- Municipality

- Flag Coat of arms
- Location of Radelfingen
- Location within Switzerland Location within Canton of Bern
- Coordinates: 47°1′N 7°16′E
- Country: Switzerland
- Canton: Bern
- District: Seeland

Area
  - Total: 14.70 km^{2} (5.68 sq mi)
- Elevation: 500 m (1,600 ft)

Population (December 2020)
  - Total: 1,272
  - Density: 86.53/km^{2} (224.1/sq mi)
- Time zone: UTC+01:00 (CET)
  - Summer (DST): UTC+02:00 (CEST)
- Postal code: 3271
- SFOS number: 309
- ISO 3166 code: CH-BE
- Surrounded by: Mühleberg, Golaten, Niederried bei Kallnach, Bargen BE, Aarberg, Seedorf BE, Wohlen bei Bern
- Twin towns: Pobezovice (Czech Republic)
- Website: radelfingen.ch

Radelfingen is a municipality in the Seeland administrative district in the canton of Bern in Switzerland.

== History ==
Roman coins have been found in Radelfingen and there is a Roman aqueduct in Staatswald-Gurgel. Radelfingen is first mentioned in 894 as Ratolingun in a donation made by Pirins to the Abbey of St. Gall. During the Middle Ages, the nearby Kyburg herrschaft of Oltigen and the Counts of Thierstein owned land in Radelfingen. The right to hold the low court was owned by local nobles until 1502 when Frienisberg Abbey acquired the right and gave it over to Bern. Radelfingen became part of the Bailiwick of Aarberg.

The village church was built on the site of Roman era building. The current building was built in 1594 and renovated in the 18th century. Some of the ruins of the former Cistercian Tedlingen Monastery are still visible in the village.

In 1851-52 a road was built which linked Radelfingen to Bern and Aarberg. Originally the municipality included villages on both sides of the Aare, but in 1868 the left bank of the river (including Niederruntigen, Buttenried) joined the municipality of Mühleberg. In 1906, the first Postauto in Switzerland, began service between Bern and Detligen with a stop in Radelfingen. A power plant was built in 1959-63 between Niederried and Radelfingen. During the early 20th century, the population of the villages declined as increasingly mechanized agriculture required fewer workers. However, by the 1980s, the population stabilized in Radelfingen and agriculture remained important to the local economy. In 2005, about 52% of the jobs in the municipality were in agriculture. The villages that made up the municipality originally had five schools, but by 2009 only the schools in Radelfingen village and Matzwil were still in operation.

== Geography ==
Radelfingen has an area of 14.71 km^{2} (5.68 sq mi). Of this area, 8.51 km^{2} (3.29 mi^{2}) or 57.7% is used for agricultural purposes, while 4.63 km^{2} (1.79 mi^{2}) or 31.4% is forested. Of the rest of the land, 0.99 km^{2} (0.38 mi^{2}) or 6.7% is settled (buildings or roads), 0.53 km^{2} (0.20 mi^{2}) or 3.6% is either rivers or lakes and 0.06 km^{2} (15 acres) or 0.4% is unproductive land.

Of the built up area, housing and buildings made up 3.1% and transportation infrastructure made up 2.6%. Out of the forested land, all of the forested land area is covered with heavy forests. Of the agricultural land, 39.6% is used for growing crops and 15.9% is pastures, while 2.3% is used for orchards or vine crops. Of the water in the municipality, 1.4% is in lakes and 2.2% is in rivers and streams.

The municipality is located on the right bank of the Aare reservoir and on the edge of the Frienisberg Plateau. It consists of the villages of Radelfingen and Detligen along with the hamlets of Landerswil, Ostermanigen, Jucher, Matzwil, Oltigen and Oberruntigen as well as scattered individual farm houses. The municipality lies in the Swiss Plateau and is 20 km (12 mi) from Bern and 7 km (4.3 mi) from Aarberg.

== Coat of arms ==
The blazon of the municipal coat of arms is Argent a Wheel Gules. This may be an example of canting arms since the German word for wheel is Rad.

== Demographics ==
Radelfingen has a population (as of December 2020) of 1,272. As of 2010, 3.4% of the population are resident foreign nationals. Over the last 10 years (2000–2010) the population has changed at a rate of -2.5%. Migration accounted for -0.7%, while births and deaths accounted for -0.8%.

Most of the population (as of 2000) speaks German (1,186 or 97.5%) as their first language, French is the second most common (10 or 0.8%) and Albanian is the third (4 or 0.3%).

As of 2008, the population was 48.7% male and 51.3% female. The population was made up of 552 Swiss men (46.8% of the population) and 22 (1.9%) non-Swiss men. There were 587 Swiss women (49.8%) and 18 (1.5%) non-Swiss women. Of the population in the municipality, 461 or about 37.9% were born in Radelfingen and lived there in 2000. There were 514 or 42.2% who were born in the same canton, while 155 or 12.7% were born somewhere else in Switzerland, and 46 or 3.8% were born outside of Switzerland.

As of 2010, children and teenagers (0–19 years old) make up 19.8% of the population, while adults (20–64 years old) make up 64.2% and seniors (over 64 years old) make up 16%.

As of 2000, there were 554 people who were single and never married in the municipality. There were 573 married individuals, 54 widows or widowers and 36 individuals who are divorced.

As of 2000, there were 121 households that consist of only one person and 53 households with five or more people. In 2000, a total of 441 apartments (91.9% of the total) were permanently occupied, while 22 apartments (4.6%) were seasonally occupied and 17 apartments (3.5%) were empty. As of 2010, the construction rate of new housing units was 1.7 new units per 1000 residents. The vacancy rate for the municipality, in 2011, was 1.09%.

The historical population is given in the following chart:

== Politics ==
In the 2011 federal election the most popular party was the SVP which received 36.8% of the vote. The next three most popular parties were the SPS (15.9%), the BDP Party (14.5%) and the GLP Party (8.8%). In the federal election, a total of 497 votes were cast, and the voter turnout was 51.2%.

== Economy ==
As of 2011, Radelfingen had an unemployment rate of 0.66%. As of 2008, there were a total of 245 people employed in the municipality. Of these, there were 111 people employed in the primary economic sector and about 42 businesses involved in this sector. 33 people were employed in the secondary sector and there were 12 businesses in this sector. 101 people were employed in the tertiary sector, with 29 businesses in this sector.

In 2008 there were a total of 179 full-time equivalent jobs. The number of jobs in the primary sector was 75, all of which were in agriculture. The number of jobs in the secondary sector was 30 of which 13 or (43.3%) were in manufacturing and 17 (56.7%) were in construction. The number of jobs in the tertiary sector was 74. In the tertiary sector; 12 or 16.2% were in wholesale or retail sales or the repair of motor vehicles, 4 or 5.4% were in the movement and storage of goods, 9 or 12.2% were in a hotel or restaurant, 6 or 8.1% were in the information industry, 10 or 13.5% were technical professionals or scientists, 11 or 14.9% were in education and 12 or 16.2% were in health care.

In 2000, there were 61 workers who commuted into the municipality and 441 workers who commuted away. The municipality is a net exporter of workers, with about 7.2 workers leaving the municipality for every one entering. Of the working population, 16.3% used public transportation to get to work, and 55.2% used a private car.

== Religion ==
From the 2000 census, 85 or 7.0% were Roman Catholic, while 940 or 77.2% belonged to the Swiss Reformed Church. Of the rest of the population, there were 8 members of an Orthodox church (or about 0.66% of the population), there were 2 individuals (or about 0.16% of the population) who belonged to the Christian Catholic Church, and there were 109 individuals (or about 8.96% of the population) who belonged to another Christian church. There were 2 (or about 0.16% of the population) who were Islamic. There were 4 individuals who were Hindu and 2 individuals who belonged to another church. 58 (or about 4.77% of the population) belonged to no church, are agnostic or atheist, and 61 individuals (or about 5.01% of the population) did not answer the question.

== Education ==
In Radelfingen about 472 or (38.8%) of the population have completed non-mandatory upper secondary education, and 146 or (12.0%) have completed additional higher education (either university or a Fachhochschule). Of the 146 who completed tertiary schooling, 69.2% were Swiss men, 26.7% were Swiss women, 4.1% were non-Swiss men.

The Canton of Bern school system provides one year of non-obligatory Kindergarten, followed by six years of Primary school. This is followed by three years of obligatory lower Secondary school where the students are separated according to ability and aptitude. Following the lower Secondary students may attend additional schooling or they may enter an apprenticeship.

During the 2009–10 school year, there were a total of 82 students attending classes in Radelfingen. There was one kindergarten class with a total of 9 students in the municipality. The municipality had 3 primary classes and 58 students. Of the primary students, 1.7% were permanent or temporary residents of Switzerland (not citizens) and 1.7% have a different mother language than the classroom language. During the same year, there was one lower secondary class with a total of 15 students. There were 13.3% who were permanent or temporary residents of Switzerland (not citizens) and 13.3% have a different mother language than the classroom language.

As of 2000, there were 26 students in Radelfingen who came from another municipality, while 99 residents attended schools outside the municipality.
