= Bargen, Bern =

Bargen
- Municipality
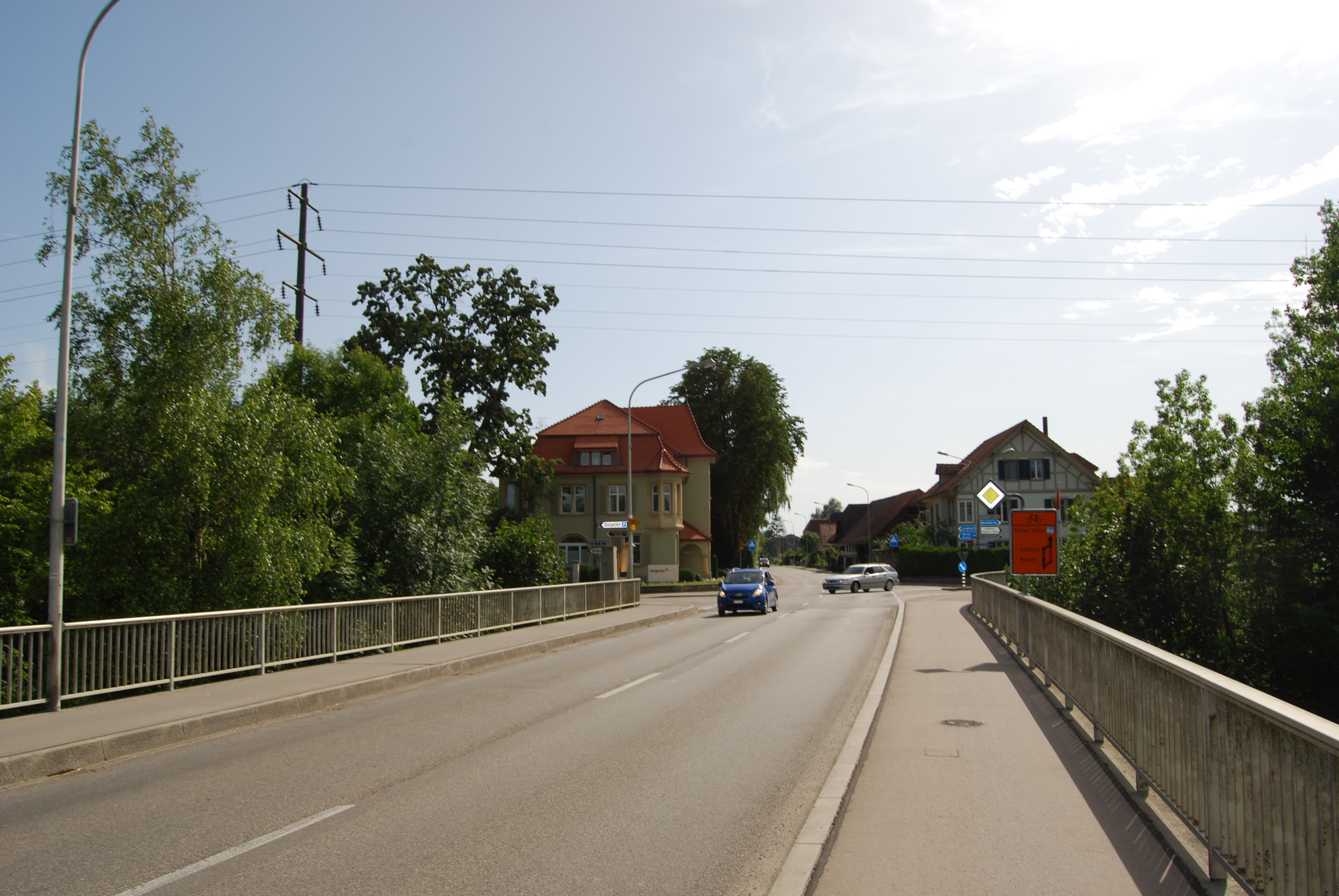

- Flag Coat of arms
- Location of Bargen
- Location within Switzerland Location within Canton of Bern
- Coordinates: 47°2′N 7°15′E
- Country: Switzerland
- Canton: Bern
- District: Seeland

Area
  - Total: 7.86 km^{2} (3.03 sq mi)
- Elevation: 448 m (1,470 ft)

Population (2020)
  - Total: 1,051
  - Density: 134/km^{2} (346/sq mi)
- Time zone: UTC+01:00 (CET)
  - Summer (DST): UTC+02:00 (CEST)
- Postal code: 3282
- SFOS number: 302
- ISO 3166 code: CH-BE
- Surrounded by: Niederried bei Kallnach, Kallnach, Siselen, Walperswil, Kappelen, Aarberg, Radelfingen.
- Website: www.bargen-be.ch

Bargen (Swiss Standard German pronunciation: [ˈbarɡn̩]) is a municipality in the Seeland administrative district in the canton of Bern in Switzerland.

== History ==
Bargen is first mentioned in 1228 as Bargen. The earliest traces of humans are some scattered Bronze Age items at Bargenfeld and Neolithic and Hallstatt items in a gravel pit. It lies on the Roman road from Aventicum to Petinesca, of which some remains are still visible. There are some medieval ruins, which are probably from the cluniac priory's barge and bridge, between the old Aare bridge and village. In 1831-32 fortifications were built in the village to protect the strategic Aare river crossing.

It was part of the herrschaft of Aarberg and came with Aarberg under Bernese control in 1375.

The romanesque-gothic village church of St Mary was first mentioned in 1228. It the 14th century it was under the patronage of the lords of La Roche. In 1415 it came under the authority of Frienisberg Abbey. It was secularized in 1528 and was then owned by Bern. The church was remodeled in 1671-72.

The village has always depended on agriculture around the Aare river for much of its economy. The Aarberger Ship Canal (1645–63), the Hagneck Canal (1868–78) and the canal for the power station at Kallnach (1909–12) all changed the landscape around the village and opened up additional farming land. In 1990, over one-third of the jobs in the village were still in agriculture.

== Geography ==
Aerial view by Walter Mittelholzer (1925)

Bargen is located in Grossen Moos, a very flat fertile area in Seeland. The surrounding parishes starting from the south and going clockwise are Niederried bei Kallnash, Kallnach, Siselen, Walperswil, Kappelen, Aarberg and Radelfingen. The border into Radelfingen is defined by the tributary of the Rhine called the Aar. To the north, Bargen is confined by the Aare-Hagneck canal. It consists of the linear village of Bargen.

Bargen has an area of 7.86 km^{2} (3.03 sq mi). Of this area, 5.56 km^{2} (2.15 mi^{2}) or 70.6% is used for agricultural purposes, while 1.47 km^{2} (0.57 mi^{2}) or 18.7% is forested. Of the rest of the land, 0.55 km^{2} (0.21 mi^{2}) or 7.0% is settled (buildings or roads), 0.31 km^{2} (0.12 mi^{2}) or 3.9% is either rivers or lakes.

Of the built up area, housing and buildings made up 2.9% and transportation infrastructure made up 2.9%. Out of the forested land, 17.4% of the total land area is heavily forested and 1.3% is covered with orchards or small clusters of trees. Of the agricultural land, 64.2% is used for growing crops and 5.0% is pastures, while 1.5% is used for orchards or vine crops. All the water in the municipality is flowing water.

== Coat of arms ==
The blazon of the municipal coat of arms is Gules a Pegasus rampant Argent.

== Demographics ==
Bargen has a population (as of December 2020) of 1,051. As of 2010, 7.9% of the population are resident foreign nationals. Over the last 10 years (2000–2010) the population has changed at a rate of 7.8%. Migration accounted for 9.7%, while births and deaths accounted for -1.7%.

Most of the population (as of 2000) speaks German (875 or 95.3%) as their first language, Serbo-Croatian is the second most common (11 or 1.2%) and Portuguese is the third (10 or 1.1%). There are 3 people who speak French, 7 people who speak Italian and 1 person who speaks Romansh.

As of 2008, the population was 50.0% male and 50.0% female. The population was made up of 444 Swiss men (45.3% of the population) and 46 (4.7%) non-Swiss men. There were 459 Swiss women (46.8%) and 3 (0.3%) non-Swiss women. Of the population in the municipality, 333 or about 36.3% were born in Bargen and lived there in 2000. There were 402 or 43.8% who were born in the same canton, while 89 or 9.7% were born somewhere else in Switzerland, and 68 or 7.4% were born outside of Switzerland.

As of 2000, children and teenagers (0–19 years old) make up 29.3% of the population, while adults (20–64 years old) make up 53.9% and seniors (over 64 years old) make up 16.8%.

As of 2000, there were 384 people who were single and never married in the municipality. There were 444 married individuals, 57 widows or widowers and 33 individuals who are divorced.

As of 2000, there were 342 private households in the municipality, and an average of 2.6 persons per household. There were 86 households that consist of only one person and 43 households with five or more people. In 2000, a total of 329 apartments (94.0% of the total) were permanently occupied, while 12 apartments (3.4%) were seasonally occupied and 9 apartments (2.6%) were empty. As of 2009, the construction rate of new housing units was 1 new units per 1000 residents.

The historical population is given in the following chart:

== Politics ==
In the 2007 federal election the most popular party was the SVP which received 39.95% of the vote. The next three most popular parties were the SPS (20.99%), the Green Party (11.27%) and the FDP (8.56%). In the federal election, a total of 328 votes were cast, and the voter turnout was 45.1%.

== Economy ==
Because other bigger villages are situated very near of Bargen, there are no department stores in the village. But despite this, there is a butcher's, a pizza delivery service, three restaurants and a little brewery.

As of 2010, Bargen had an unemployment rate of 1.2%. As of 2008, there were 85 people employed in the primary economic sector and about 30 businesses involved in this sector. 254 people were employed in the secondary sector and there were 7 businesses in this sector. 89 people were employed in the tertiary sector, with 17 businesses in this sector.

In 2008 the total number of full-time equivalent jobs was 357. The number of jobs in the primary sector was 54, all of which were in agriculture. The number of jobs in the secondary sector was 243 of which 160 or (65.8%) were in manufacturing and 83 (34.2%) were in construction. The number of jobs in the tertiary sector was 60. In the tertiary sector; 23 or 38.3% were in wholesale or retail sales or the repair of motor vehicles, 17 or 28.3% were in a hotel or restaurant, 1 was in the information industry, 1 was a technical professional or scientist, 8 or 13.3% were in education and 6 or 10.0% were in health care.

In 2000, there were 100 workers who commuted into the municipality and 350 workers who commuted away. The municipality is a net exporter of workers, with about 3.5 workers leaving the municipality for every one entering. Of the working population, 12.6% used public transportation to get to work, and 51.9% used a private car.

== Religion ==
From the 2000 census, 73 or 8.0% were Roman Catholic, while 745 or 81.2% belonged to the Swiss Reformed Church. Of the rest of the population, there were 40 individuals (or about 4.36% of the population) who belonged to another Christian church. There were 26 (or about 2.83% of the population) who were Islamic. 24 (or about 2.61% of the population) belonged to no church, are agnostic or atheist, and 29 individuals (or about 3.16% of the population) did not answer the question.

== Education ==
In Bargen about 340 or (37.0%) of the population have completed non-mandatory upper secondary education, and 65 or (7.1%) have completed additional higher education (either university or a Fachhochschule). Of the 65 who completed tertiary schooling, 78.5% were Swiss men, 15.4% were Swiss women.

The Canton of Bern school system provides one year of non-obligatory Kindergarten, followed by six years of Primary school. This is followed by three years of obligatory lower Secondary school where the students are separated according to ability and aptitude. Following the lower Secondary students may attend additional schooling or they may enter an apprenticeship.

During the 2009-10 school year, there were a total of 88 students attending classes in Bargen. There was one kindergarten class with a total of 25 students in the municipality. Of the kindergarten students, 4.0% were permanent or temporary residents of Switzerland (not citizens). The municipality had 3 primary classes and 48 students. Of the primary students, 18.8% were permanent or temporary residents of Switzerland (not citizens) and 12.5% have a different mother language than the classroom language. During the same year, there was one lower secondary class with a total of 15 students. There were 33.3% who were permanent or temporary residents of Switzerland (not citizens) and 13.3% have a different mother language than the classroom language.

As of 2000, there were 61 students from Bargen who attended schools outside the municipality.

== Transport ==
Bargen is situated on the Palézieux–Lyss line and has its own railway station. The village itself is spread along the main road from Aarberg to Kerzers.
