= Niederried bei Kallnach =

- Former municipality
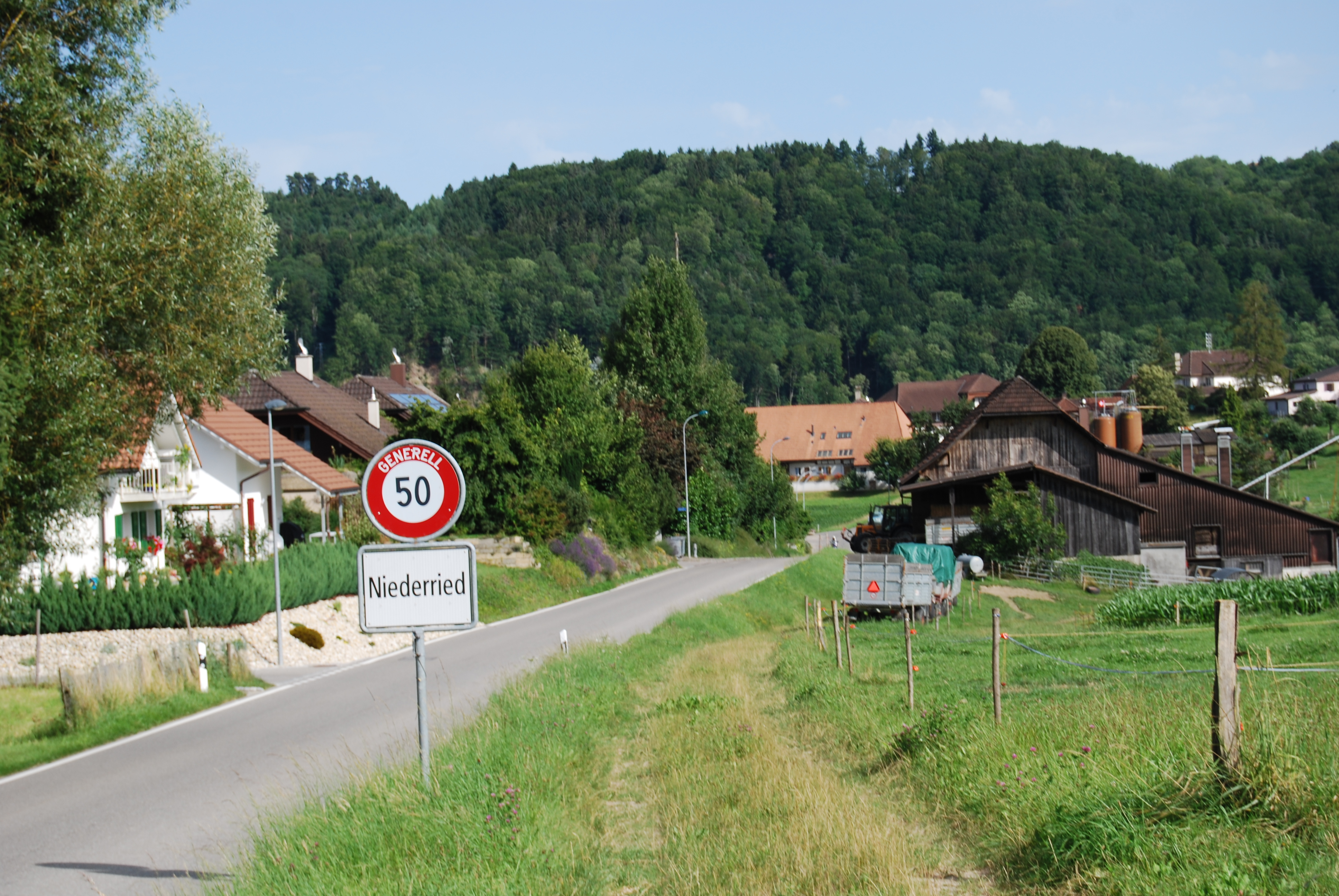

- Flag Coat of arms
- Location of Niederried bei Kallnach
- Location within Switzerland Location within Canton of Bern
- Coordinates: 47°1′N 7°15′E
- Country: Switzerland
- Canton: Bern
- District: Seeland

Area
  - Total: 4.6 km^{2} (1.8 sq mi)
- Elevation: 518 m (1,699 ft)

Population (Dec 2011)
  - Total: 295
  - Density: 64/km^{2} (170/sq mi)
- Time zone: UTC+01:00 (CET)
  - Summer (DST): UTC+02:00 (CEST)
- Postal code: 3283
- SFOS number: 308
- ISO 3166 code: CH-BE
- Surrounded by: Kallnach, Bargen BE, Radelfingen, Golaten, Kerzers, Fräschels
- Twin towns: Nisovice (Czech Republic)
- Website: niederried.ch

Niederried bei Kallnach is a former municipality in the Seeland administrative district in the canton of Bern in Switzerland.

To the southeast of the municipality lies the Niederried reservoir. It is a refuge of international importance for water and wading birds.

The municipality of Niederried bei Kallnach merged on 1 January 2013 into Kallnach.

== History ==
Several neolithic and Hallstatt burial mounds, some of which contain grave goods, have been discovered in Niederried. During the Middle Ages Kallnach and Niederried formed a single lower court. In 1521 and 1522, this lower court was added to the Landvogtei of Aarberg. In 1530 the two villages were combined into a single parish.

Niederried has always been a small farming village. Around 1910 the population doubled during the construction of the power plants at Kallnach, Niederried-Radelfingen and Aarberg as well as the creation of Niederried dam and the associated Niederried reservoir. Creation of the reservoir flooded a number of fields in the municipality and changed the village's borders. In 1974, a primary school was built in the village, but the upper primary and secondary school for the village is in Kallnach.

== Geography ==
Niederried bei Kallnach had an area of 4.52 km^{2} (1.75 sq mi). Of this area, 2.42 km^{2} (0.93 mi^{2}) or 53.5% is used for agricultural purposes, while 1.66 km^{2} (0.64 mi^{2}) or 36.7% is forested. Of the rest of the land, 0.24 km^{2} (0.093 mi^{2}) or 5.3% is settled (buildings or roads), 0.22 km^{2} (0.085 mi^{2}) or 4.9% is either rivers or lakes and 0.01 km^{2} (2.5 acres) or 0.2% is unproductive land.

Of the built up area, housing and buildings made up 3.1% and transportation infrastructure made up 1.5%. Out of the forested land, all of the forested land area is covered with heavy forests. Of the agricultural land, 44.0% is used for growing crops and 9.1% is pastures. Of the water in the municipality, 1.8% is in lakes and 3.1% is in rivers and streams.

The former municipality is located on the left bank of the Aare river. It includes part of the man-made Niederried reservoir.

== Coat of arms ==
The blazon of the municipal coat of arms is Argent three Trunks Sable emflamed Gules in fess and a base Vert.

== Demographics ==
Niederried bei Kallnach had a population (as of 2011) of 295. As of 2010, 4.4% of the population are resident foreign nationals. Over the last 10 years (2000–2010) the population has changed at a rate of 8.1%. Migration accounted for 7%, while births and deaths accounted for 2.9%.

Most of the population (as of 2000) speaks German (258 or 94.9%) as their first language, Portuguese is the second most common (5 or 1.8%) and Serbo-Croatian is the third (4 or 1.5%). There is 1 person who speaks French and 1 person who speaks Italian.

As of 2008, the population was 50.7% male and 49.3% female. The population was made up of 144 Swiss men (48.6% of the population) and 6 (2.0%) non-Swiss men. There were 139 Swiss women (47.0%) and 7 (2.4%) non-Swiss women. Of the population in the municipality, 70 or about 25.7% were born in Niederried bei Kallnach and lived there in 2000. There were 127 or 46.7% who were born in the same canton, while 33 or 12.1% were born somewhere else in Switzerland, and 30 or 11.0% were born outside of Switzerland.

As of 2010, children and teenagers (0–19 years old) make up 18.6% of the population, while adults (20–64 years old) make up 62.2% and seniors (over 64 years old) make up 19.3%.

As of 2000, there were 110 people who were single and never married in the municipality. There were 134 married individuals, 19 widows or widowers and 9 individuals who are divorced.

As of 2000, there were 22 households that consist of only one person and 9 households with five or more people. In 2000, a total of 107 apartments (91.5% of the total) were permanently occupied, while 6 apartments (5.1%) were seasonally occupied and 4 apartments (3.4%) were empty.

The historical population is given in the following chart:

== Politics ==
In the 2011 federal election, the most popular party was the SVP which received 41.6% of the vote. The next three most popular parties were the BDP Party (19.8%), the SPS (17.4%) and the Green Party (6.2%). In the federal election, a total of 103 votes were cast, and the voter turnout was 43.6%.

== Economy ==
As of 2011, Niederried bei Kallnach had an unemployment rate of 0.26%. As of 2008, there were a total of 45 people employed in the municipality. Of these, there were 21 people employed in the primary economic sector and about 8 businesses involved in this sector. 15 people were employed in the secondary sector and there were 6 businesses in this sector. 9 people were employed in the tertiary sector, with 4 businesses in this sector.

In 2008, there were a total of 33 full-time equivalent jobs. The number of jobs in the primary sector was 14, all of which were in agriculture. The number of jobs in the secondary sector was 13 of which 8 or (61.5%) were in manufacturing and 6 (46.2%) were in construction. The number of jobs in the tertiary sector was 6. In the tertiary sector; 1 was in the sale or repair of motor vehicles and 3 or 50.0% were in a hotel or restaurant.

In 2000, there were 5 workers who commuted into the municipality and 122 workers who commuted away. The municipality is a net exporter of workers, with about 24.4 workers leaving the municipality for every one entering. Of the working population, 1.9% used public transportation to get to work, and 72.6% used a private car.

== Religion ==
From the 2000 census, 18 or 6.6% were Roman Catholic, while 213 or 78.3% belonged to the Swiss Reformed Church. Of the rest of the population, there were 26 individuals (or about 9.56% of the population) who belonged to another Christian church. There were 11 (or about 4.04% of the population) who were Islamic. 9 (or about 3.31% of the population) belonged to no church, are agnostic or atheist, and 8 individuals (or about 2.94% of the population) did not answer the question.

== Education ==
Niederried has its own school for the first through fourth grades. The upper grades of primary and all of middle school are in Kallnach, and for high school the children must be sent to Aarberg.

In Niederried bei Kallnach about 111 or (40.8%) of the population have completed non-mandatory upper secondary education, and 30 or (11.0%) have completed additional higher education (either university or a Fachhochschule). Of the 30 who completed tertiary schooling, 63.3% were Swiss men, 20.0% were Swiss women.

As of 2000, there were 25 students from Niederried bei Kallnach who attended schools outside the municipality.
