= Golaten =

- Former municipality
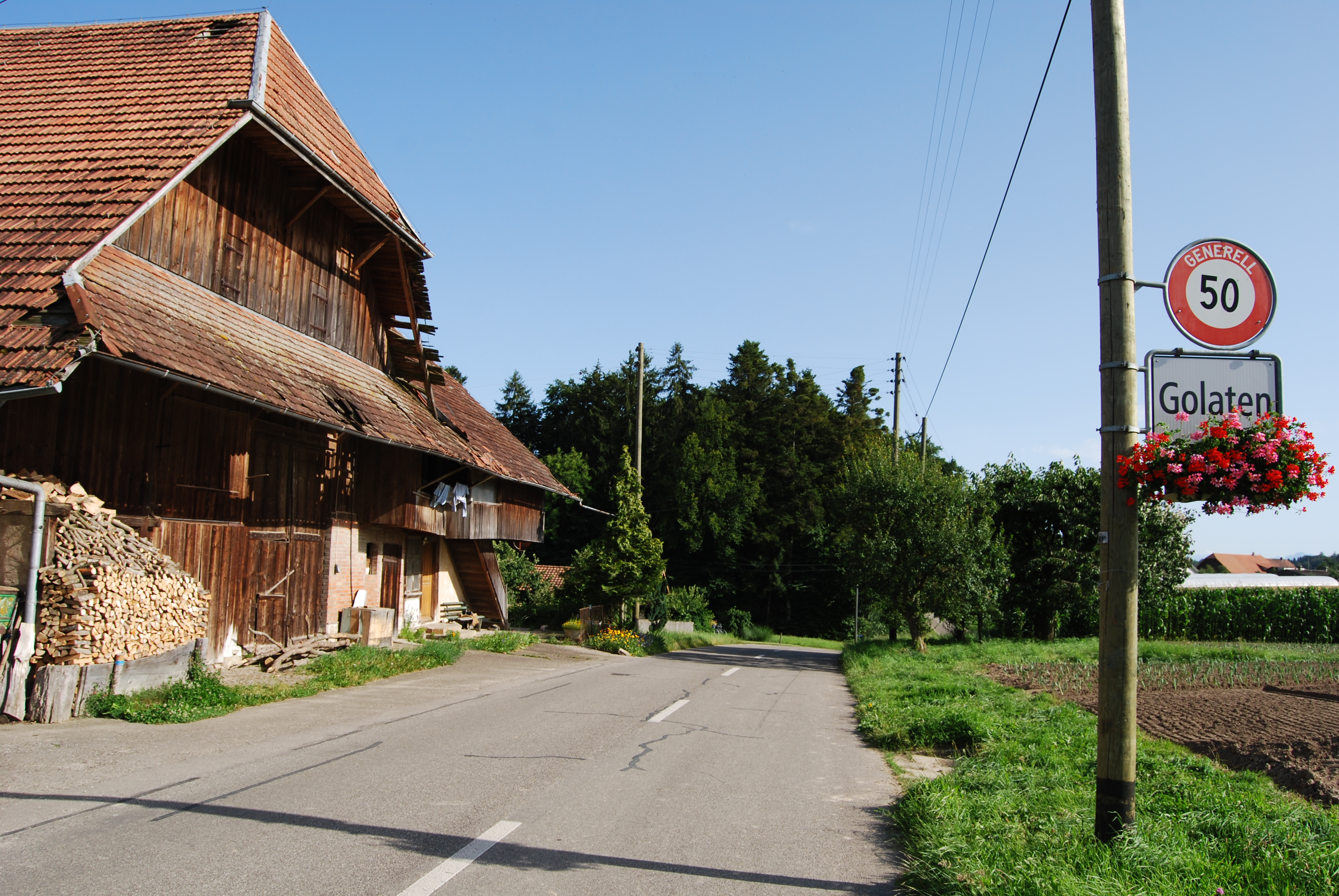

- Flag Coat of arms
- Location of Golaten
- Location within Switzerland Location within Canton of Bern
- Coordinates: 46°59′N 7°14′E
- Country: Switzerland
- Canton: Bern
- District: Bern-Mittelland

Government
  - Mayor: Beatrice Johner

Area
  - Total: 2.8 km^{2} (1.1 sq mi)
- Elevation: 519 m (1,703 ft)

Population (Dec 2011)
  - Total: 290
  - Density: 100/km^{2} (270/sq mi)
- Time zone: UTC+01:00 (CET)
  - Summer (DST): UTC+02:00 (CEST)
- Postal code: 3207
- SFOS number: 664
- ISO 3166 code: CH-BE
- Surrounded by: Radelfingen, Mühleberg, Wileroltigen, Kerzers, Niederried bei Kallnach
- Website: SFSO statistics

Golaten is a former municipality in the Bern-Mittelland administrative district in the canton of Bern in Switzerland. On 1 January 2019 the former municipality of Golaten merged into the municipality of Kallnach.

== History ==
Aerial view of Oberruntigen and Golaten by Walter Mittelholzer (1925)

Golaten is first mentioned in 983-93 as Gulada. In 1277 it was mentioned as Golatun.

The oldest trace of a settlement in the area are Roman era bricks and pottery fragments which were found near the Wittenberg farm. By the 10th century St. Maurice's Abbey was the largest landholder in the village. It eventually became part of the Herrschaft of Oltigen. The entire Herrschaft was absorbed by Bern in 1410/12, including Golaten. The village was always part of the parish of Kerzers. During the Protestant Reformation both municipalities converted to the new faith and Golaten remained part of the Kerzers parish. In 1793, it fought with the neighboring communities, in the Canton of Fribourg, over the Golatenmoos moor. The Golatenmoos is now part of the Bernese municipality of Kallnach. After the 1798 French invasion, Golaten remained part of the Canton of Bern, despite attempts by the Canton of Fribourg to annex it.

Today about half of the population of the municipality commute to jobs in Kerzers or Bern.

== Geography ==
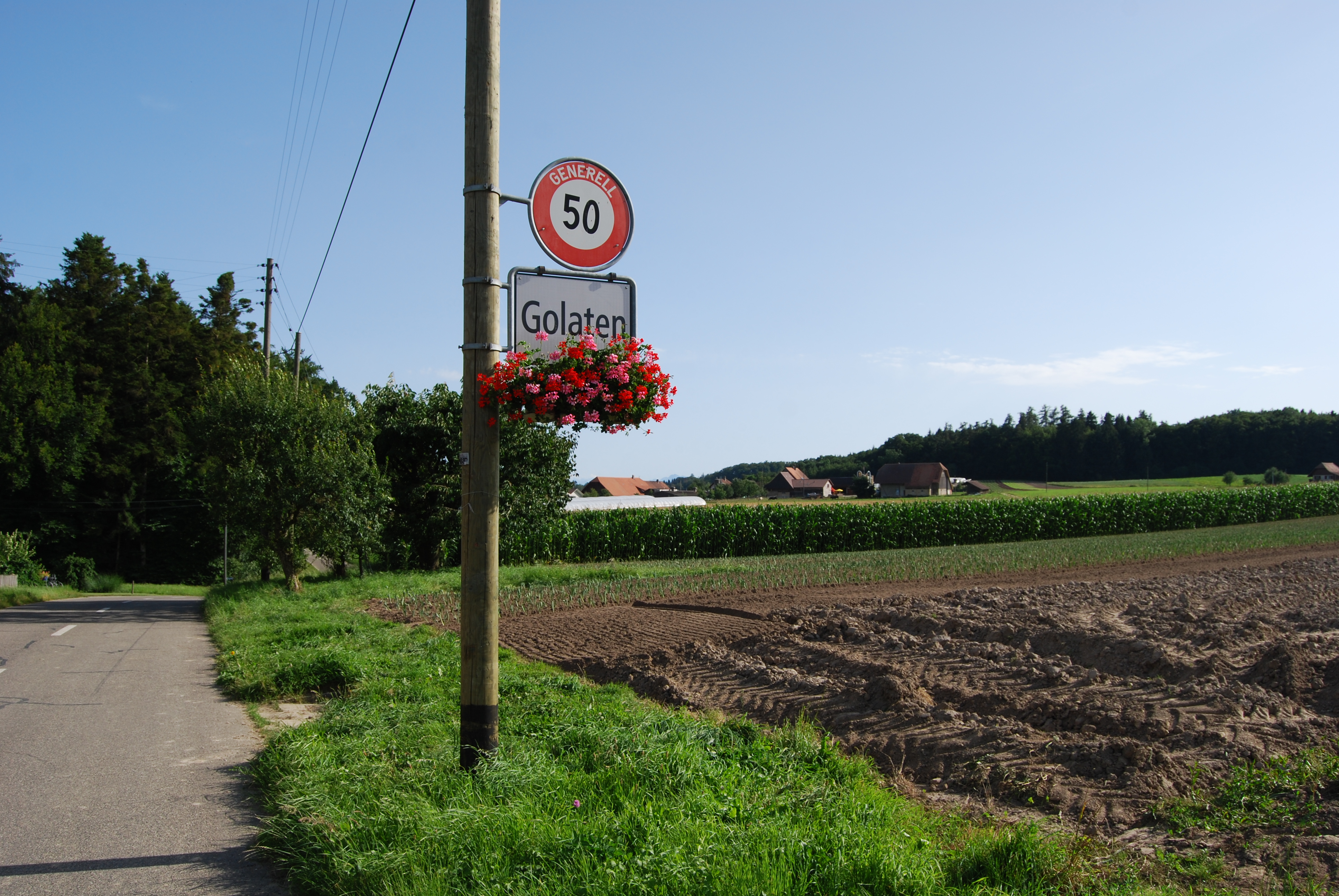
Fields at the municipal border

Golaten has an area of 2.79 km^{2} (1.08 sq mi). As of 2012, a total of 1.43 km^{2} (0.55 mi^{2}) or 51.1% is used for agricultural purposes, while 0.57 km^{2} (0.22 mi^{2}) or 20.4% is forested. Of the rest of the land, 0.23 km^{2} (0.089 mi^{2}) or 8.2% is settled (buildings or roads), 0.29 km^{2} (0.11 mi^{2}) or 10.4% is either rivers or lakes and 0.26 km^{2} (0.10 mi^{2}) or 9.3% is unproductive land.

During the same year, housing and buildings made up 5.7% and transportation infrastructure made up 1.4%. Out of the forested land, 19.3% of the total land area is heavily forested and 1.1% is covered with orchards or small clusters of trees. Of the agricultural land, 31.4% is used for growing crops and 13.2% is pastures, while 6.4% is used for orchards or vine crops. Of the water in the municipality, 8.2% is in lakes and 2.1% is in rivers and streams.

There are two towns within the municipality, Golaten and Lachen and multiple small groups of farm houses (ex. Mannenwil, Wittenberg).

Golaten lies in the Swiss Plateau on the reservoir Niederried, which makes it a good area for waterfowl. On the southeastern edge of the municipality the Aare and Saane rivers flow together.

On 31 December 2009 Amtsbezirk Laupen, the municipality's former district, was dissolved. On the following day, 1 January 2010, it joined the newly created Verwaltungskreis Bern-Mittelland.

== Coat of arms ==
The blazon of the municipal coat of arms is Sable a Horse Shoe Argent.

== Demographics ==
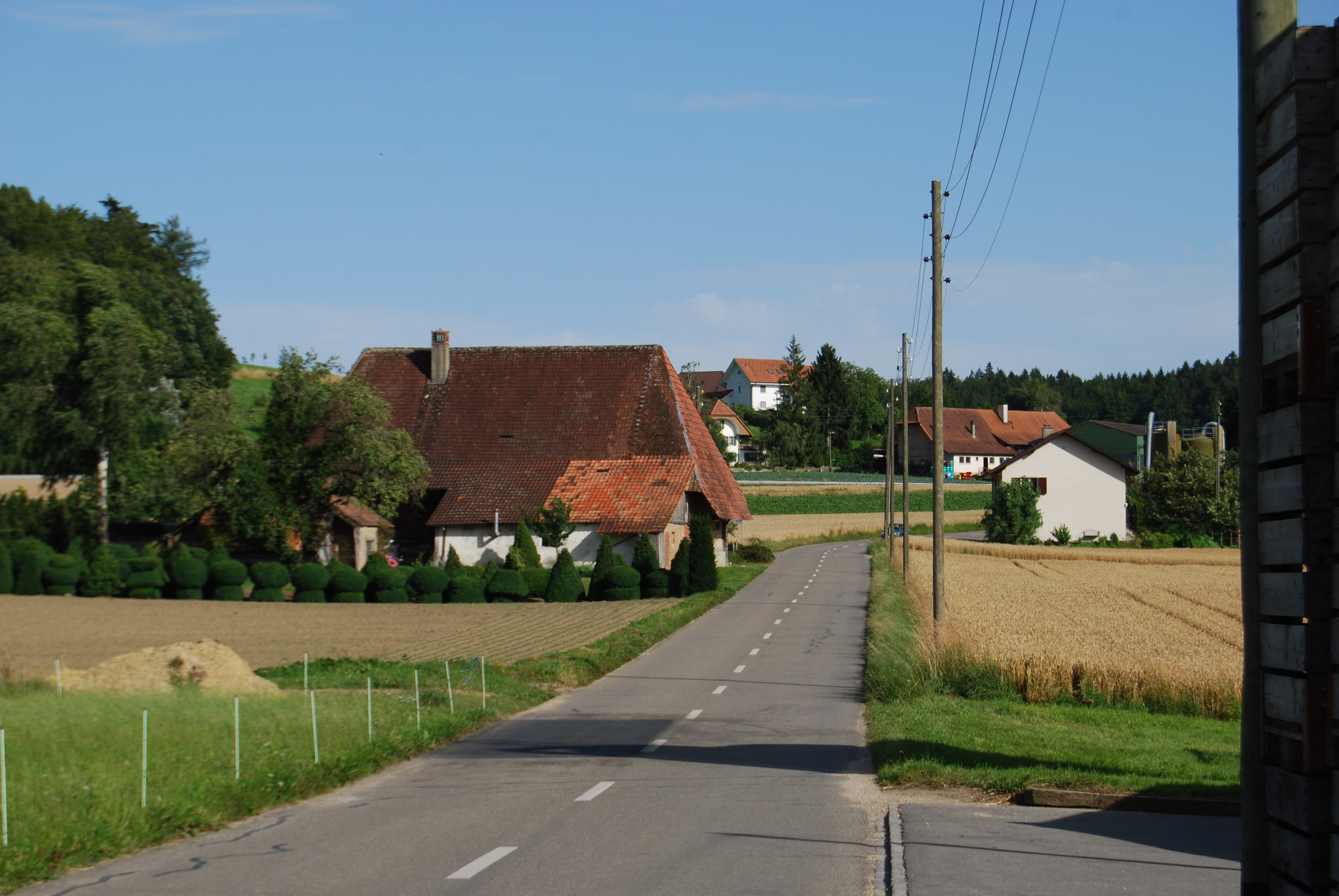
Farm houses and small apartments in Golaten

Golaten had a population (As of 2019) of 302. As of 2010, 6.3% of the population are resident foreign nationals. Over the last 10 years (2001-2011) the population has changed at a rate of 2.1%. Migration accounted for 1.1%, while births and deaths accounted for -0.4%.

Most of the population (as of 2000) speaks German (312 or 94.3%) as their first language, Albanian is the second most common (9 or 2.7%) and Portuguese is the third (4 or 1.2%). There is 1 person who speaks French.

As of 2008, the population was 51.1% male and 48.9% female. The population was made up of 130 Swiss men (45.8% of the population) and 15 (5.3%) non-Swiss men. There were 136 Swiss women (47.9%) and 3 (1.1%) non-Swiss women. Of the population in the municipality, 165 or about 49.8% were born in Golaten and lived there in 2000. There were 97 or 29.3% who were born in the same canton, while 35 or 10.6% were born somewhere else in Switzerland, and 26 or 7.9% were born outside of Switzerland.

As of 2011, children and teenagers (0–19 years old) make up 17.9% of the population, while adults (20–64 years old) make up 61.7% and seniors (over 64 years old) make up 20.3%.

As of 2000, there were 150 people who were single and never married in the municipality. There were 164 married individuals, 14 widows or widowers and 3 individuals who are divorced.

As of 2010, there were 35 households that consist of only one person and 6 households with five or more people. In 2000, a total of 106 apartments (90.6% of the total) were permanently occupied, while 5 apartments (4.3%) were seasonally occupied and 6 apartments (5.1%) were empty. The vacancy rate for the municipality, in 2012, was 2.8%.

The historical population is given in the following chart:

== Politics ==
In the 2011 federal election the most popular party was the Swiss People's Party (SVP) which received 43.5% of the vote. The next three most popular parties were the Conservative Democratic Party (BDP) (17.9%), the Green Party (6.8%) and the FDP.The Liberals (6.6%). In the federal election, a total of 117 votes were cast, and the voter turnout was 48.5%.

== Economy ==
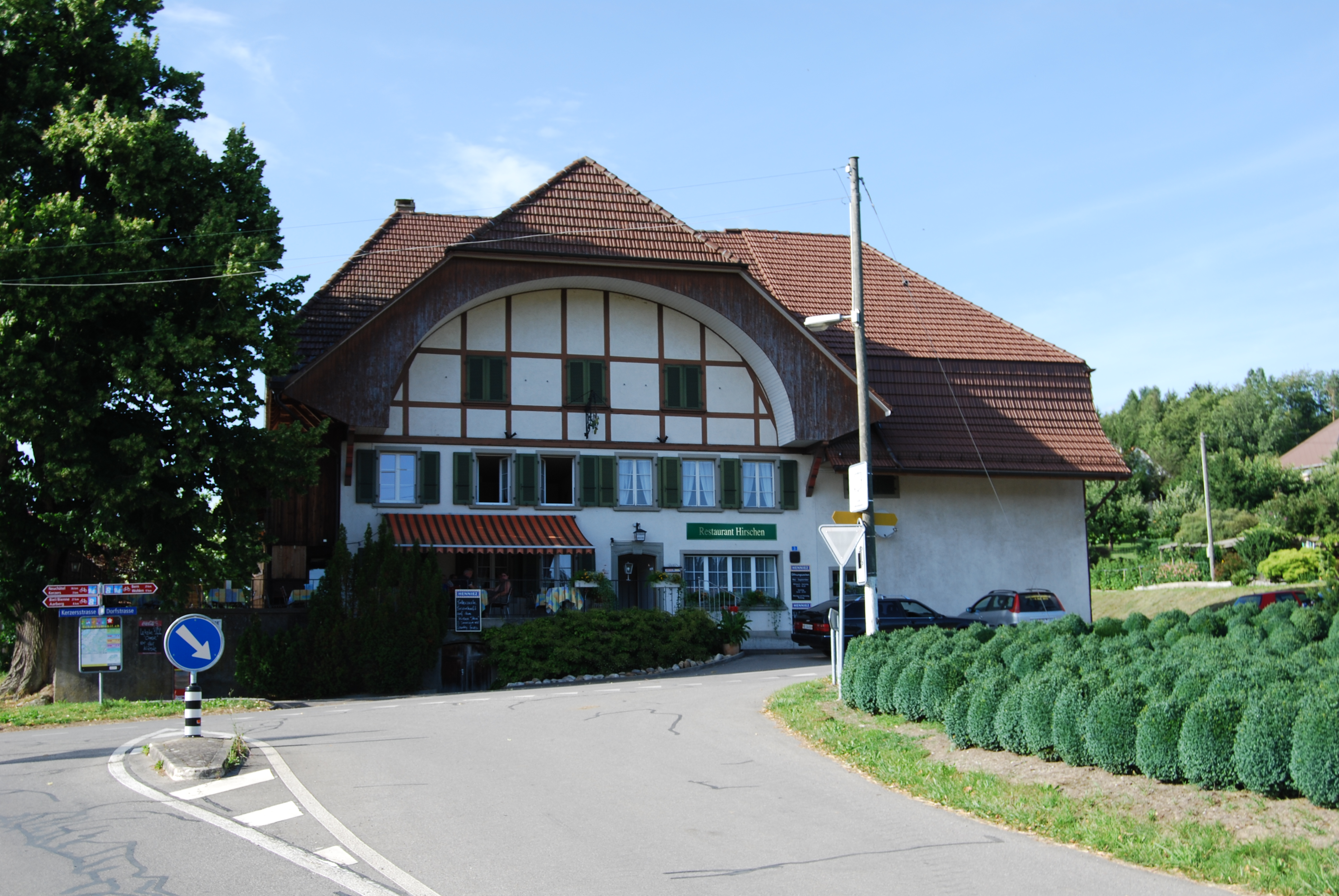
The half-timbered Restaurant Hirschen in Golaten

As of 2011, Golaten had an unemployment rate of 0.09%. As of 2008, there were a total of 156 people employed in the municipality. Of these, there were 113 people employed in the primary economic sector and about 22 businesses involved in this sector. 14 people were employed in the secondary sector and there were 4 businesses in this sector. 29 people were employed in the tertiary sector, with 6 businesses in this sector. There were 187 residents of the municipality who were employed in some capacity, of which females made up 40.1% of the workforce.

In 2008 there were a total of 118 full-time equivalent jobs. The number of jobs in the primary sector was 83, all of which were in agriculture. The number of jobs in the secondary sector was 13 of which 3 or (23.1%) were in manufacturing and 10 (76.9%) were in construction. The number of jobs in the tertiary sector was 22. In the tertiary sector; 14 or 63.6% were in wholesale or retail sales or the repair of motor vehicles, 2 or 9.1% were in a hotel or restaurant, 1 was a technical professional or scientist, 3 or 13.6% were in education.

In 2000, there were 31 workers who commuted into the municipality and 102 workers who commuted away. The municipality is a net exporter of workers, with about 3.3 workers leaving the municipality for every one entering. A total of 85 workers (73.3% of the 116 total workers in the municipality) both lived and worked in Golaten. Of the working population, 10.7% used public transportation to get to work, and 46.5% used a private car.

In 2011 the average local and cantonal tax rate on a married resident of Golaten making 150,000 CHF was 12.7%, while an unmarried resident's rate was 18.6%. For comparison, the average rate for the entire canton in 2006 was 13.9% and the nationwide rate was 11.6%. In 2009 there were a total of 130 tax payers in the municipality. Of that total, 36 made over 75,000 CHF per year. The average income of the over 75,000 CHF group in Golaten was 115,417 CHF, while the average across all of Switzerland was 130,478 CHF.

== Religion ==
From the 2000 census, 267 or 80.7% belonged to the Swiss Reformed Church, while 11 or 3.3% were Roman Catholic. Of the rest of the population, there was 1 member of an Orthodox church, and there were 40 individuals (or about 12.08% of the population) who belonged to another Christian church. There were 18 (or about 5.44% of the population) who were Islamic. 7 (or about 2.11% of the population) belonged to no church, are agnostic or atheist, and 7 individuals (or about 2.11% of the population) did not answer the question.

== Education ==
In Golaten about 58.6% of the population have completed non-mandatory upper secondary education, and 12.6% have completed additional higher education (either university or a Fachhochschule). Of the 25 who had completed some form of tertiary schooling listed in the census, 76.0% were Swiss men, 20.0% were Swiss women.

The Canton of Bern school system provides one year of non-obligatory Kindergarten, followed by six years of Primary school. This is followed by three years of obligatory lower Secondary school where the students are separated according to ability and aptitude. Following the lower Secondary students may attend additional schooling or they may enter an apprenticeship.

During the 2011-12 school year, there were a total of 8 students attending classes in Golaten. There were no kindergarten classes in the municipality. The municipality had one primary class and 8 students. Of the primary students, 12.5% were permanent or temporary residents of Switzerland (not citizens) and 12.5% have a different mother language than the classroom language.

As of 2000, there were a total of 41 students attending any school in the municipality. Of those, 38 both lived and attended school in the municipality, while 3 students came from another municipality. During the same year, 14 residents attended schools outside the municipality.
