= Petinesca =

Archeological site in the Canton of Bern, in Switzerland

Coordinates: 47.110°N 7.298°E

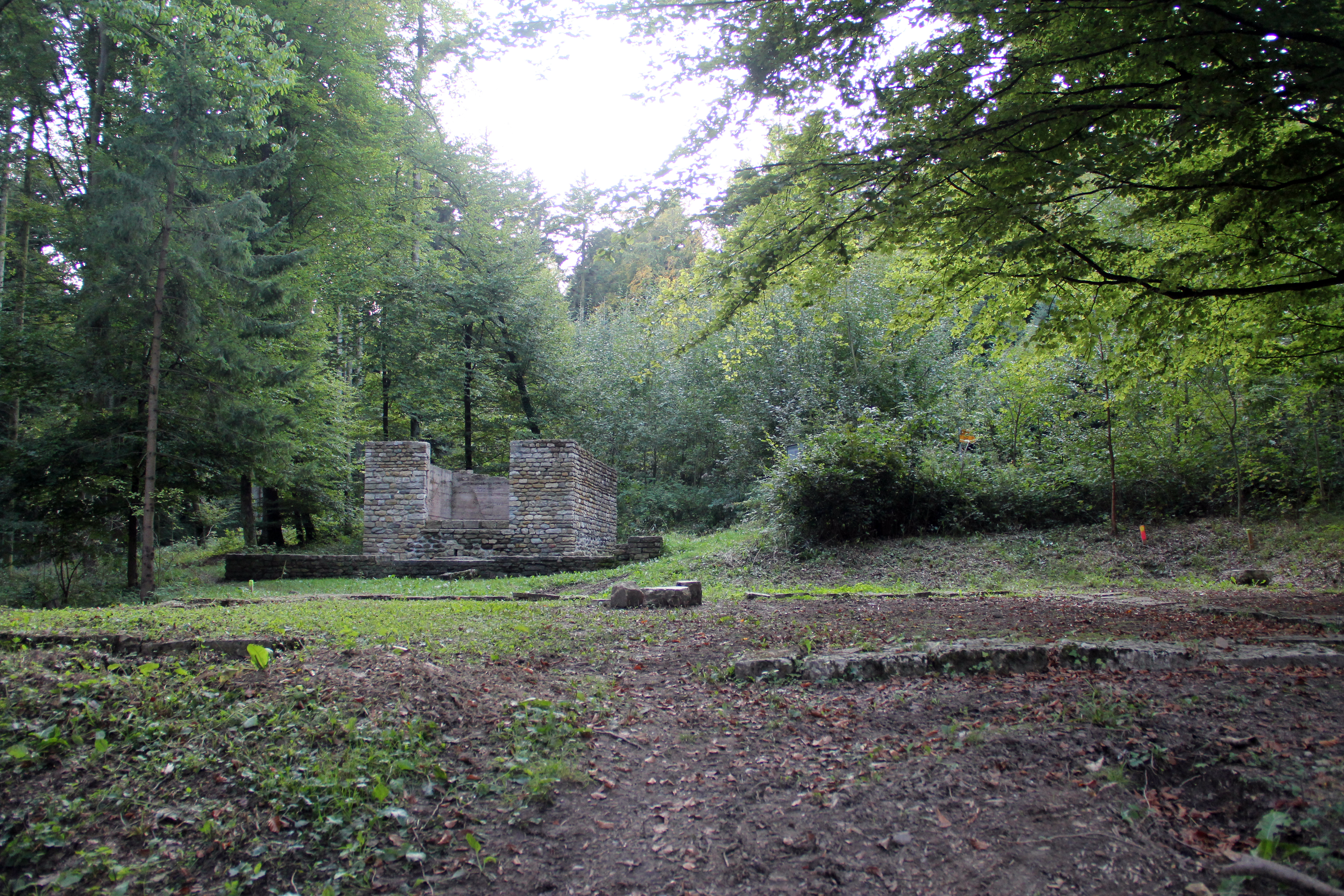
Petinesca

Petinesca is an archeological site on the territory of Studen, a community of the Canton of Bern, in Switzerland, where Celtic and Roman vestiges were found.

== Celtic and Roman vestiges ==
The site lies at the SE edge of the Jensberg mountain. Celtic and Roman ruins were found, some of which are still visible. The site comprises a Celtic fortification (Oppidum), and a fortified village dating from the Roman Empire, as a regional centre dating back to the 2nd Century B.C. till the 4th Century A.D.

=== Ruins of the Petinesca Roman station ===
In those times the area was already well colonised.

Petinesca was most certainly one of the Roman stations that served to ensure the maintenance and security of one of the main Roman road in Helvetii. The road led from Aventicum (Avenches) through Murten, Kerzers and Kallnach to Salodorum (Solothurn) and then to Vindonissa (Windisch), along the Eastern part of the Seeland. A bifurcation of the road ran through the steep gorge of Taubenloch and crossed the Jura through the Col de Pierre Pertuis pass and to Augusta Raurica which led to Germany along the Rhine.

Via Witzwil, a second road crossed the Seeland between the Lake of Neuchâtel and the lake of Murten.

== See also ==
- Switzerland in the Roman era
