= Kerzers =

- Municipality
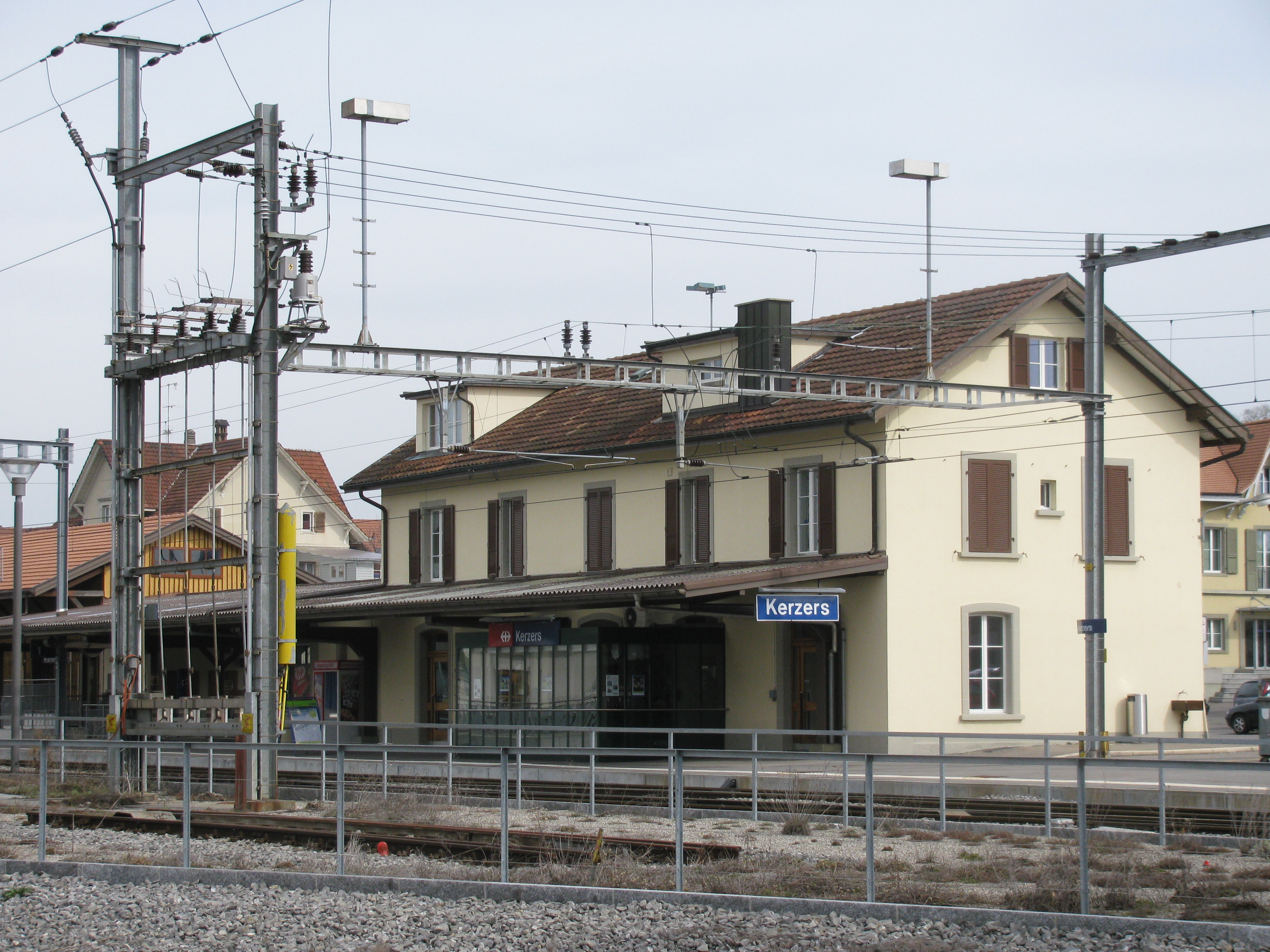
- Kerzers train station

- Flag Coat of arms
- Location of Kerzers
- Location within Switzerland Location within Canton of Fribourg
- Coordinates: 46°59′N 7°12′E
- Country: Switzerland
- Canton: Fribourg
- District: See

Government
  - Executive: Gemeinderat with 7 members
  - Mayor: Gemeindepräsident

Area
  - Total: 12.23 km^{2} (4.72 sq mi)
- Elevation: 450 m (1,480 ft)

Population (December 2020)
  - Total: 5,037
  - Density: 411.9/km^{2} (1,067/sq mi)
- Time zone: UTC+01:00 (CET)
  - Summer (DST): UTC+02:00 (CEST)
- Postal code: 3210
- SFOS number: 2265
- ISO 3166 code: CH-FR
- Surrounded by: Fräschels, Golaten (BE), Gurbrü (BE), Kallnach (BE), Münchenwiler (BE), Niederried bei Kallnach (BE), Ried bei Kerzers, Treiten (BE), Wileroltigen (BE)
- Website: www.kerzers.ch

Kerzers is a municipality in the district of See in the canton of Fribourg in Switzerland. Its French name is Chiètres (pronounced [ʃjɛtʁ]; Arpitan: Chiétres [ˈcɛtʁə]).

== History ==
Kerzers is first mentioned in 926 as Cartris. In 1153 it was mentioned as Kercers.

In March 2026, a fire on a bus killed at least six people.

Aerial photograph (1949)

== Geography ==
Kerzers has an area of 12.28 km^{2} (4.74 sq mi). Of this area, 8.38 km^{2} (3.24 mi^{2}) or 68.5% is used for agricultural purposes, while 1.81 km^{2} (0.70 mi^{2}) or 14.8% is forested. Of the rest of the land, 1.95 km^{2} (0.75 mi^{2}) or 15.9% is settled (buildings or roads), 0.07 km^{2} (17 acres) or 0.6% is either rivers or lakes and 0.01 km^{2} (2.5 acres) or 0.1% is unproductive land.

Of the built up area, industrial buildings made up 2.0% of the total area while housing and buildings made up 6.9% and transportation infrastructure made up 4.8%. while parks, green belts and sports fields made up 1.2%. Out of the forested land, 13.7% of the total land area is heavily forested and 1.1% is covered with orchards or small clusters of trees. Of the agricultural land, 62.1% is used for growing crops and 5.0% is pastures, while 1.5% is used for orchards or vine crops. All the water in the municipality is flowing water.

The municipality is located in the See/Lac district, on the eastern edge of the Grosses Moos wetlands.

== Coat of arms ==
The blazon of the municipal coat of arms is Azure two Candles lit proper. Since Kerze means candle in German, the coat of arms is an example of canting.

== Demographics ==
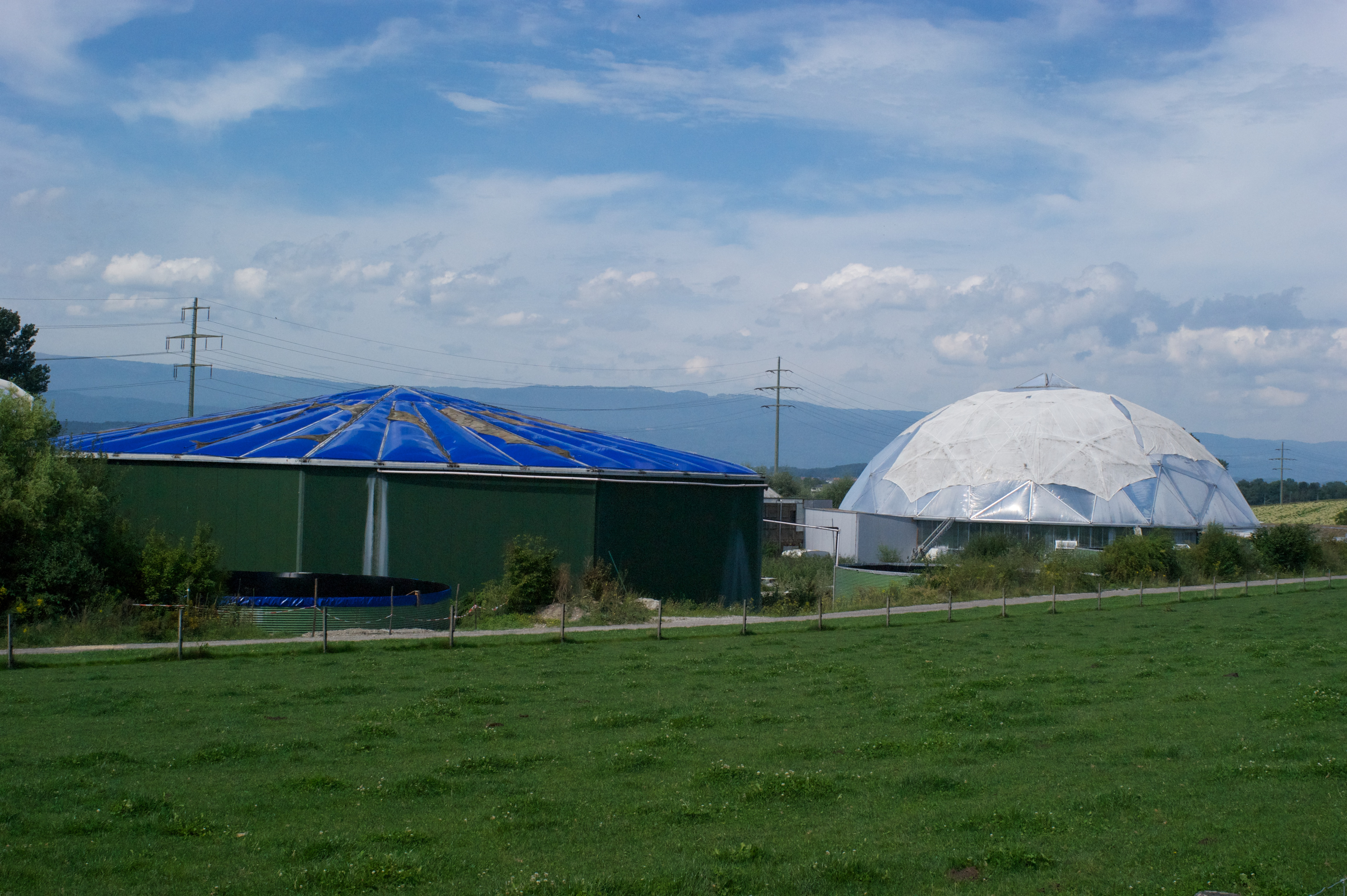
Papiliorama (Butterfly enclosure) in Kerzers village

Kerzers has a population (as of December 2020) of 5,037. As of 2008, 18.9% of the population are resident foreign nationals. Over the last 10 years (2000–2010) the population has changed at a rate of 20.3%. Migration accounted for 10.7%, while births and deaths accounted for 5.1%.

Most of the population (as of 2000) speaks German (3,387 or 87.0%) as their first language, Portuguese is the second most common (99 or 2.5%) and Albanian is the third (99 or 2.5%). There are 95 people who speak French, 40 people who speak Italian and 3 people who speak Romansh.

As of 2008, the population was 49.3% male and 50.7% female. The population was made up of 1,752 Swiss men (38.5% of the population) and 491 (10.8%) non-Swiss men. There were 1,877 Swiss women (41.3%) and 426 (9.4%) non-Swiss women. Of the population in the municipality, 1,219 or about 31.3% were born in Kerzers and lived there in 2000. There were 339 or 8.7% who were born in the same canton, while 1,590 or 40.9% were born somewhere else in Switzerland, and 616 or 15.8% were born outside of Switzerland.

As of 2000, children and teenagers (0–19 years old) make up 27.9% of the population, while adults (20–64 years old) make up 60.8% and seniors (over 64 years old) make up 11.3%.

As of 2000, there were 1,716 people who were single and never married in the municipality. There were 1,866 married individuals, 182 widows or widowers and 128 individuals who are divorced.

As of 2000, there were 1,499 private households in the municipality, and an average of 2.5 persons per household. There were 425 households that consist of only one person and 129 households with five or more people. In 2000, a total of 1,440 apartments (89.7% of the total) were permanently occupied, while 93 apartments (5.8%) were seasonally occupied and 73 apartments (4.5%) were empty. As of 2009, the construction rate of new housing units was 4 new units per 1,000 residents. The vacancy rate for the municipality, in 2010, was 0.79%.

The historical population is given in the following chart:

== Heritage sites of national significance ==
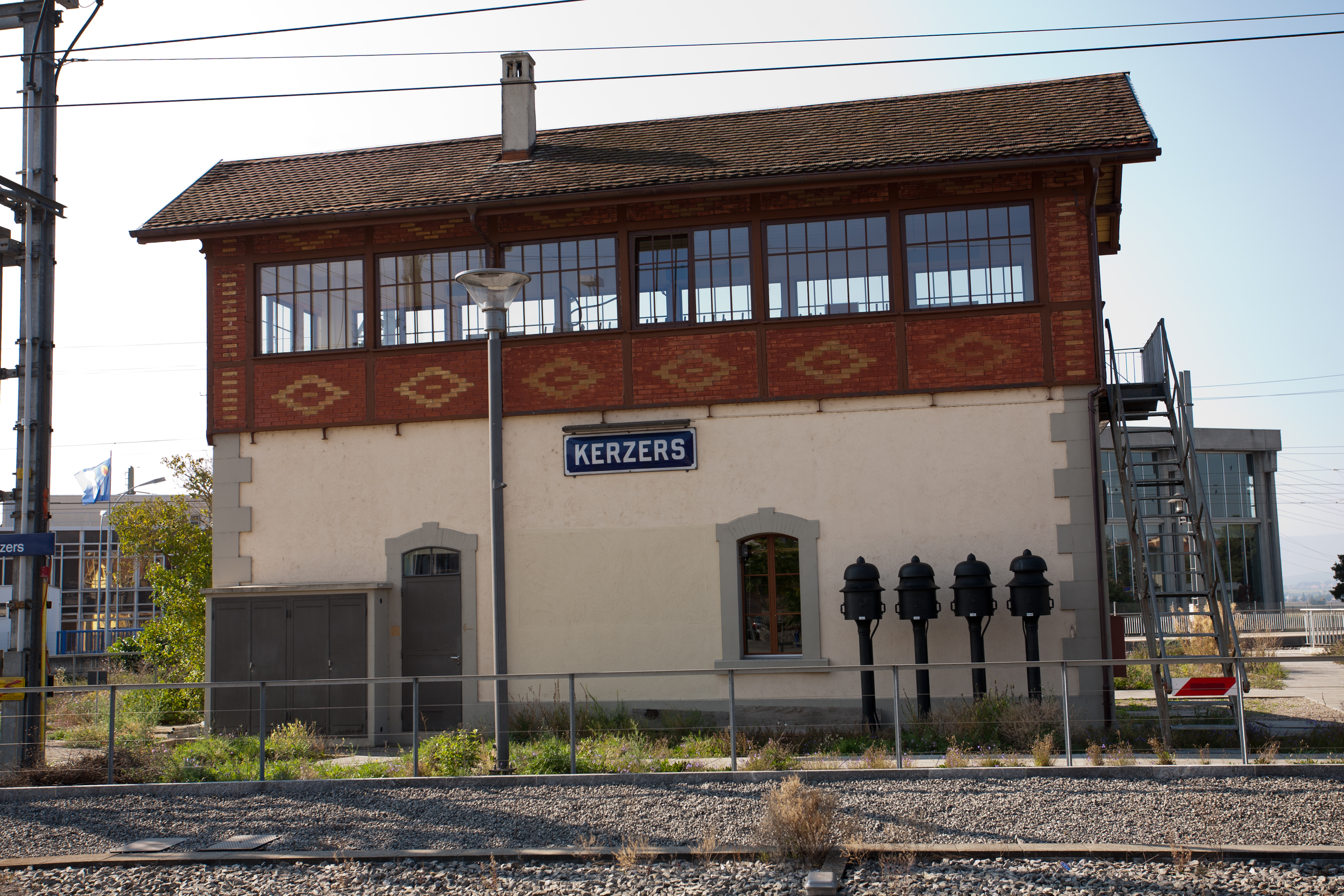
Stellwerk (signal house at the train station) in Kerzers

The Stellwerk (signal house at the train station) is listed as a Swiss heritage site of national significance. The entire urbanized village of Kerzers is part of the Inventory of Swiss Heritage Sites.

== Politics ==
In the 2011 federal election the most popular party was the SVP which received 26.0% of the vote. The next three most popular parties were the SPS (19.5%), the FDP (14.4%) and the CVP (12.9%).

The SVP received about the same percentage of the vote as they did in the 2007 Federal election (29.3% in 2007 vs 26.0% in 2011). The SPS moved from third in 2007 (with 16.4%) to second in 2011, the FDP moved from second in 2007 (with 18.5%) to third and the CVP retained about the same popularity (15.4% in 2007). A total of 1,328 votes were cast in this election, of which 16 or 1.2% were invalid.

== Economy ==
As of 2010, Kerzers had an unemployment rate of 2.1%. As of 2008, there were 183 people employed in the primary economic sector and about 44 businesses involved in this sector. 358 people were employed in the secondary sector and there were 53 businesses in this sector. 1,384 people were employed in the tertiary sector, with 163 businesses in this sector. There were 2,105 residents of the municipality who were employed in some capacity, of which females made up 43.8% of the workforce.

In 2008 the total number of full-time equivalent jobs was 1,593. The number of jobs in the primary sector was 138, all of which were in agriculture. The number of jobs in the secondary sector was 327 of which 163 or (49.8%) were in manufacturing and 159 (48.6%) were in construction. The number of jobs in the tertiary sector was 1,128. In the tertiary sector; 542 or 48.0% were in wholesale or retail sales or the repair of motor vehicles, 166 or 14.7% were in the movement and storage of goods, 61 or 5.4% were in a hotel or restaurant, 3 or 0.3% were in the information industry, 17 or 1.5% were the insurance or financial industry, 59 or 5.2% were technical professionals or scientists, 63 or 5.6% were in education and 97 or 8.6% were in health care.

In 2000, there were 867 workers who commuted into the municipality and 1,244 workers who commuted away. The municipality is a net exporter of workers, with about 1.4 workers leaving the municipality for every one entering. Of the working population, 21% used public transportation to get to work, and 50.8% used a private car.

== Religion ==
From the 2000 census, 625 or 16.1% were Roman Catholic, while 2,580 or 66.3% belonged to the Swiss Reformed Church. Of the rest of the population, there were 58 members of an Orthodox church (or about 1.49% of the population), and there were 116 individuals (or about 2.98% of the population) who belonged to another Christian church. There were 209 (or about 5.37% of the population) who were Islamic. There were 5 individuals who were Buddhist, 14 individuals who were Hindu and 3 individuals who belonged to another church. 205 (or about 5.27% of the population) belonged to no church, are agnostic or atheist, and 131 individuals (or about 3.37% of the population) did not answer the question.

== Education ==
In Kerzers about 1,417 or (36.4%) of the population have completed non-mandatory upper secondary education, and 481 or (12.4%) have completed additional higher education (either university or a Fachhochschule). Of the 481 who completed tertiary schooling, 65.9% were Swiss men, 25.8% were Swiss women, 4.8% were non-Swiss men and 3.5% were non-Swiss women.

The Canton of Fribourg school system provides one year of non-obligatory Kindergarten, followed by six years of Primary school. This is followed by three years of obligatory lower Secondary school where the students are separated according to ability and aptitude. Following the lower Secondary students may attend a three or four year optional upper Secondary school. The upper Secondary school is divided into gymnasium (university preparatory) and vocational programs. After they finish the upper Secondary program, students may choose to attend a Tertiary school or continue their apprenticeship.

During the 2010–11 school year, there were a total of 735 students attending 42 classes in Kerzers. A total of 743 students from the municipality attended any school, either in the municipality or outside of it. There were 5 kindergarten classes with a total of 97 students in the municipality. The municipality had 15 primary classes and 298 students. During the same year, there were 18 lower secondary classes with a total of 295 students. There were no upper Secondary classes or vocational classes, but there were 33 upper Secondary students and 54 upper Secondary vocational students who attended classes in another municipality. The municipality had 4 special Tertiary classes, with 45 specialized Tertiary students.

As of 2000, there were 116 students in Kerzers who came from another municipality, while 119 residents attended schools outside the municipality.

== Transportation ==
The municipality has two railway stations, Kerzers and Kerzers Papiliorama. The former sits at the junction of the Bern–Neuchâtel and Palézieux–Lyss lines and has regular service to Bern, Neuchâtel, Lausanne, Payerne, and Lyss. The latter is located to the north on the Palézieux–Lyss line and provides direct service to the butterfly sanctuary.
