= Aarberg =

- Municipality
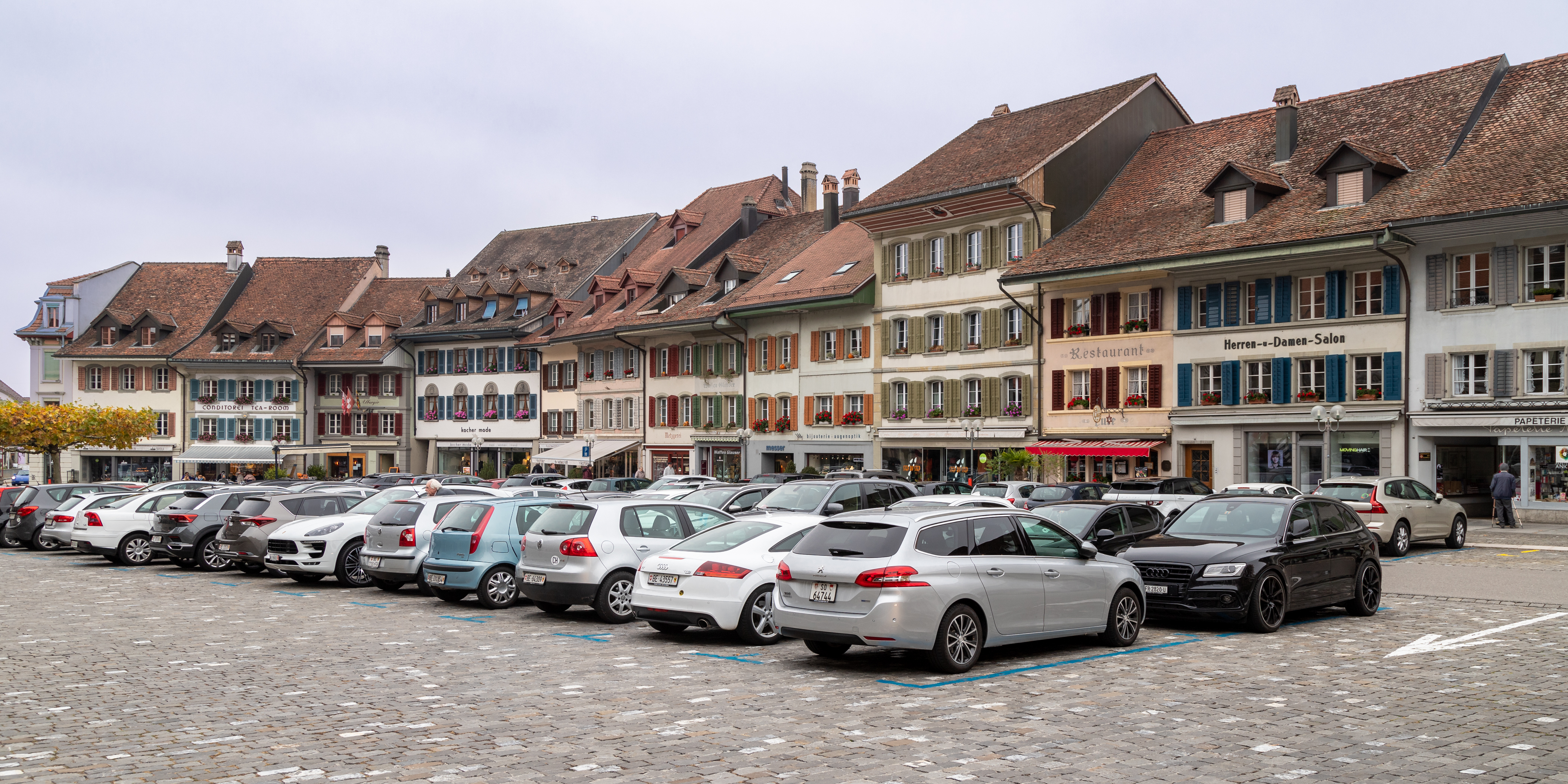
- Stadtplatz (Town square)

- Flag Coat of arms
- Location of Aarberg
- Location within Switzerland Location within Canton of Bern
- Coordinates: 47°2′N 7°16′E
- Country: Switzerland
- Canton: Bern
- District: Seeland

Government
  - Mayor: Gemeindepräsident; Arnold Stalder FDP/PRD (as of 2008)

Area
  - Total: 7.93 km^{2} (3.06 sq mi)
- Elevation (Stadtplatz): 455 m (1,493 ft)

Population (December 2008)
  - Total: 3,963
  - Density: 500/km^{2} (1,290/sq mi)
- Time zone: UTC+01:00 (CET)
  - Summer (DST): UTC+02:00 (CEST)
- Postal code: 3270
- SFOS number: 301
- ISO 3166 code: CH-BE
- Surrounded by: Bargen, Kappelen, Lyss, Radelfingen, Seedorf
- Website: www.aarberg.ch

Aarberg (Swiss Standard German pronunciation: [ˈaːrbɛrɡ]) is a historic town and a municipality in the Seeland administrative district in the canton of Bern in Switzerland.

Aarberg lies 20 km (12 mi) from Bern above the river Aare. With an area of 7.93 km^{2} (3.06 sq mi), Aarberg borders Bargen, Kappelen, Lyss, Radelfingen and Seedorf.

Aarberg is not to be confused with Aarburg in Aargau or with Aarbergen in Germany.

The town was once located on an island with the Aare and Little Aare (Kleine Aare) flowing around it. The old town grew up around the edge of the island with a large open plaza in the middle. In addition to the old town, Aarberg also includes the new outer quarter, and the villages of Spins, Mühletal and Grafenmoos.

== History ==
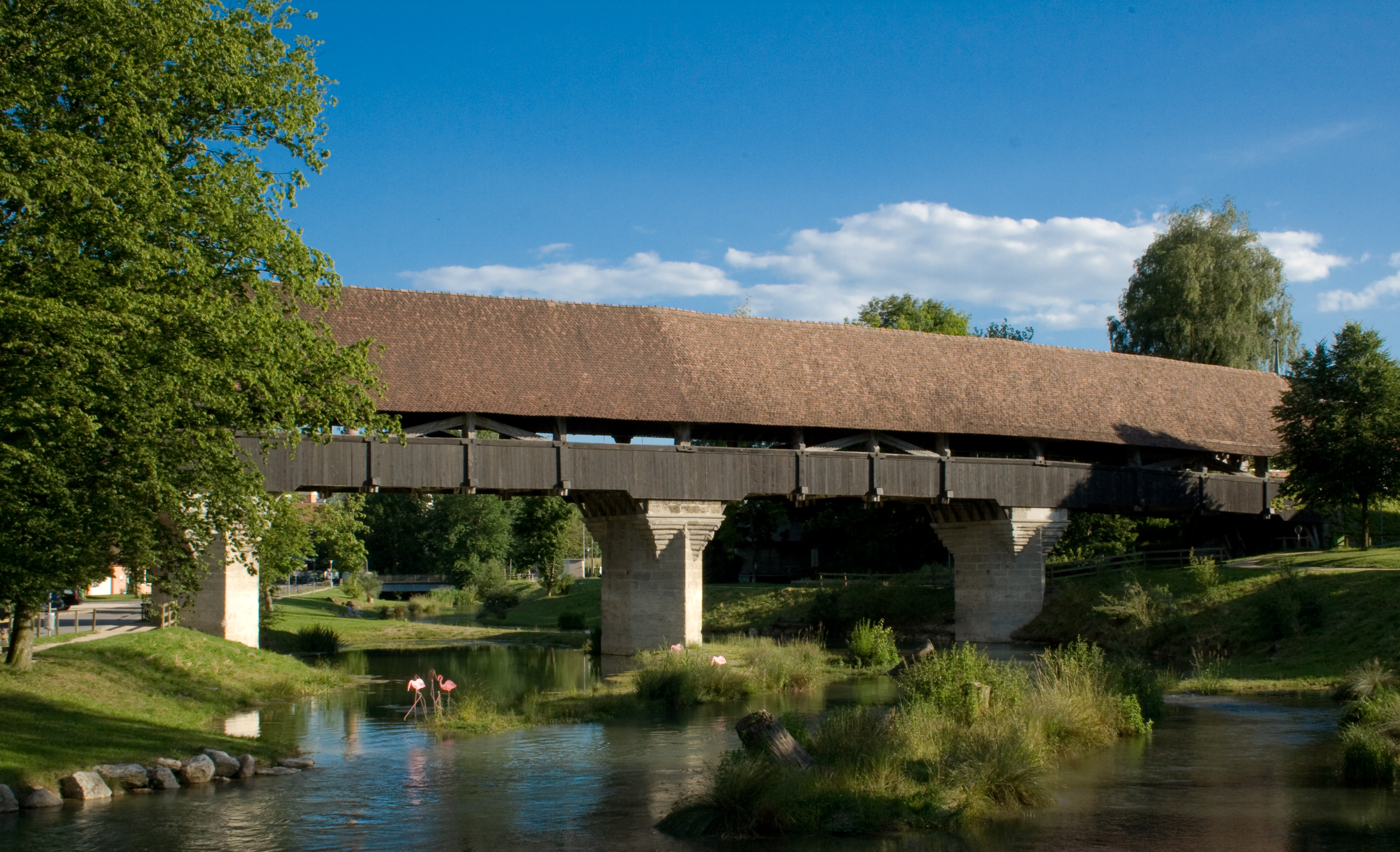
Bridge over the Aare, built in 1568

Where Aarberg now stands was once an island surrounded by the Aare and the Little Aare. By 1138 there was a small pilgrim home and hospital with a bridge, the Bargenbrügg, over the Aare. This bridge was a key river crossing from Bern to Büren an der Aare.

The town itself was founded between 1220 and 1225 by count Ulrich III of Neuchâtel. The count had recently acquired the rulership over this region and needed a central location from which to rule. The island and the key bridge was a natural location for a town. Aarberg is first mentioned in 1236 as Arberc. In 1267 it was mentioned as opidum de Arberch. By the 14th century, Aarberg lay along the most important of the three trade roads in the region. The old Roman roads that connected Solothurn, Aarberg and Murten as well as southern Germany with Lyon and Rome all passed near Aarberg.

The oldest official seal of citizenship in the town dates from 1249. Ulrich IV reaffirmed the town privileges in 1271. Initially the town was unwalled with two rows of wooden houses around a central narrow plaza. Following fires in 1419 and 1477 the town was rebuilt in stone and set back about 10 m (33 ft) creating the current, impressive central lens shaped plaza.

The town was besieged in 1339, 1382 and 1386 but not taken. In 1358 the Graf (or Count) Peter von Aarberg was in financial difficulties and began looking for someone to buy the town. After years of unsuccessful attempts, in 1377-79 he was able to sell the town and his rights as ruler to Bern. The Bernese bailiff took up residence in Aarberg Castle in 1379. In 1414, the toll on the bridges over the Aar as well as the expensive construction and repair on the bridges, was given to Bern. The bridges were rebuilt following floods in 1414, 1443, 1490, 1557 and the current bridge dates from 1567–68.

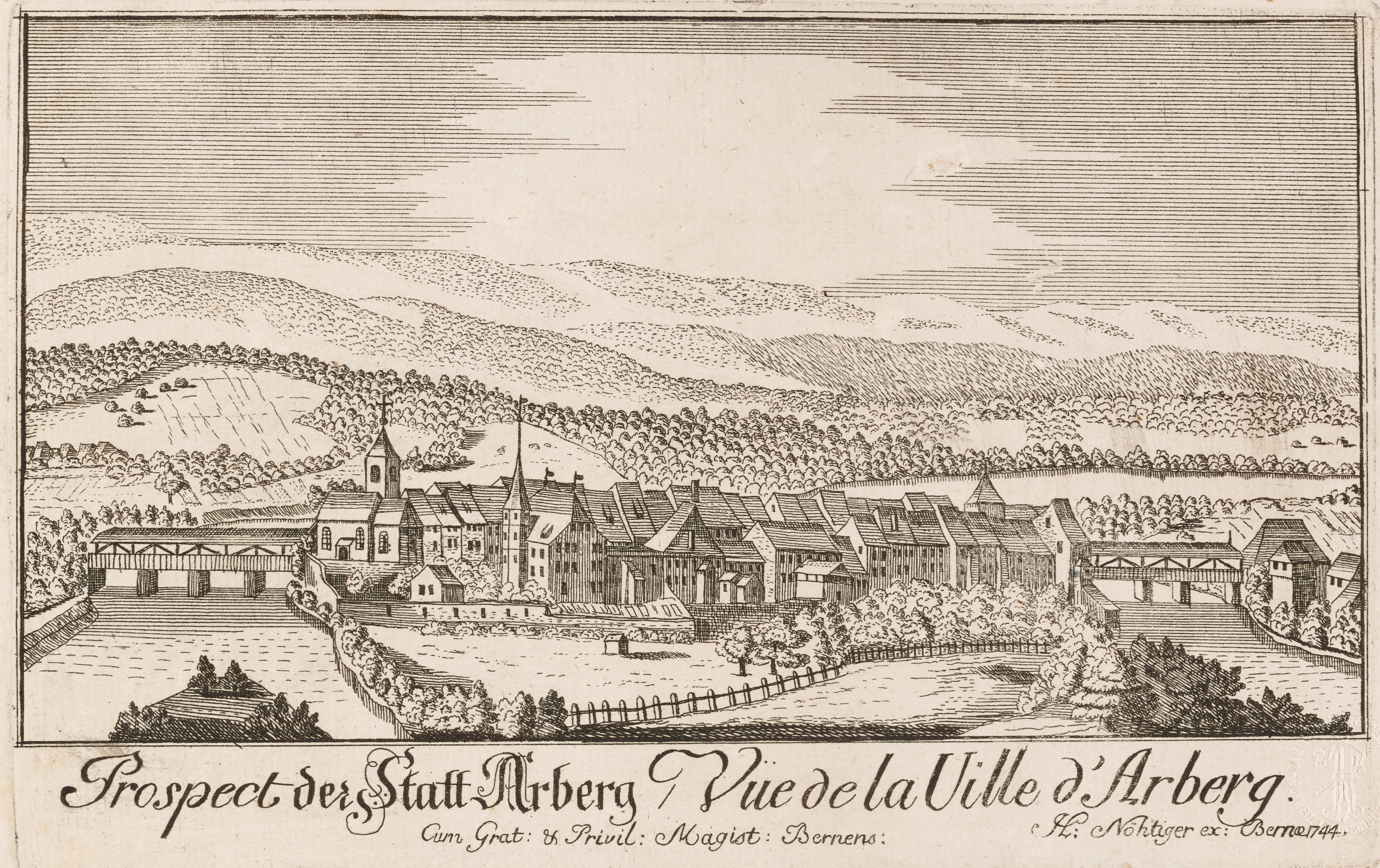
Copperplate engraving of Aarberg, by Johann Ludwig Nöthiger, 1744

The church at Aarberg, which is on the western border of the Bishopric of Constance, was built in 1484. The church was rebuilt in 1575 on the site of the former castle of Aarberg. The tower of the church, built in 1526, is from stone salvaged from the demolished Pilgrim Hospital Church. The cemetery was located next to the new church. In 1418, Bern placed the church under the patronage of the Münster of Bern, however following the Protestant Reformation (1528) the patronage was withdrawn.

The government of the town was a mayor or Schultheiß and a 24-member council (12 nobles and 12 citizens) under a vogt who lived in the Amthaus (built in 1608-10) and had the rights of high justice.

Aarberg has always been in a unique position for trade. Its location over the Aar and near major trade roads made the business of the town revolve around trade. The large central market plaza in the town was one of the largest trans-shipment centers in Switzerland. Many transport companies and inns, including the Tavernen Krone (Crown) and Tavernen Falken (Falcon), grew up around the plaza. The yearly market (1271 mentioned, 1507 two per year, 1681 three per year, 1759 quarterly), by 1478 was an important market that drew salt, iron, steel and cloth merchants from the entire region. The town also tried to expand into farming by purchasing Alp Chuffort ob Lignières, Spins and Mühletal.

The French invasion of Switzerland in 1798 severely damaged the town. Under the Helvetic Republic Aarberg was included in the Zollikofen District, though this only lasted until 1803. After this Aarberg became the capital of the Bezirk or county of Aarberg. During the Paris July Revolution, in 1830, the commanders of the Swiss Army moved to Aarberg. The fortified town was a key strong point on the western border between Geneva and Basel.

With the invention of the railroad and alterations to Jura rivers, everything changed for Aarberg. The Bern-Lyss-Biel rail line bypassed Aarberg completely, reducing the amount of trade flowing through the town. Neither the Broye Valley line (from Lyss to Lausanne, built in 1876) or the creation of paved roads made a major change. At the same time, the Hagneck canal diverted a portion of the Aare and prevented the periodic flooding of the town. The Kleine Aare was dammed and Aarberg island became a peninsula.

During the 19th century business slowed in Aarberg, though the town grew. New quarters grew up in areas that had been covered by the Aare: Brückfeld, Leimernacher, Sunnmatt und Mühlau. Business shifted from transportation to farming, concrete construction and precision parts manufacturing.

== Geography ==
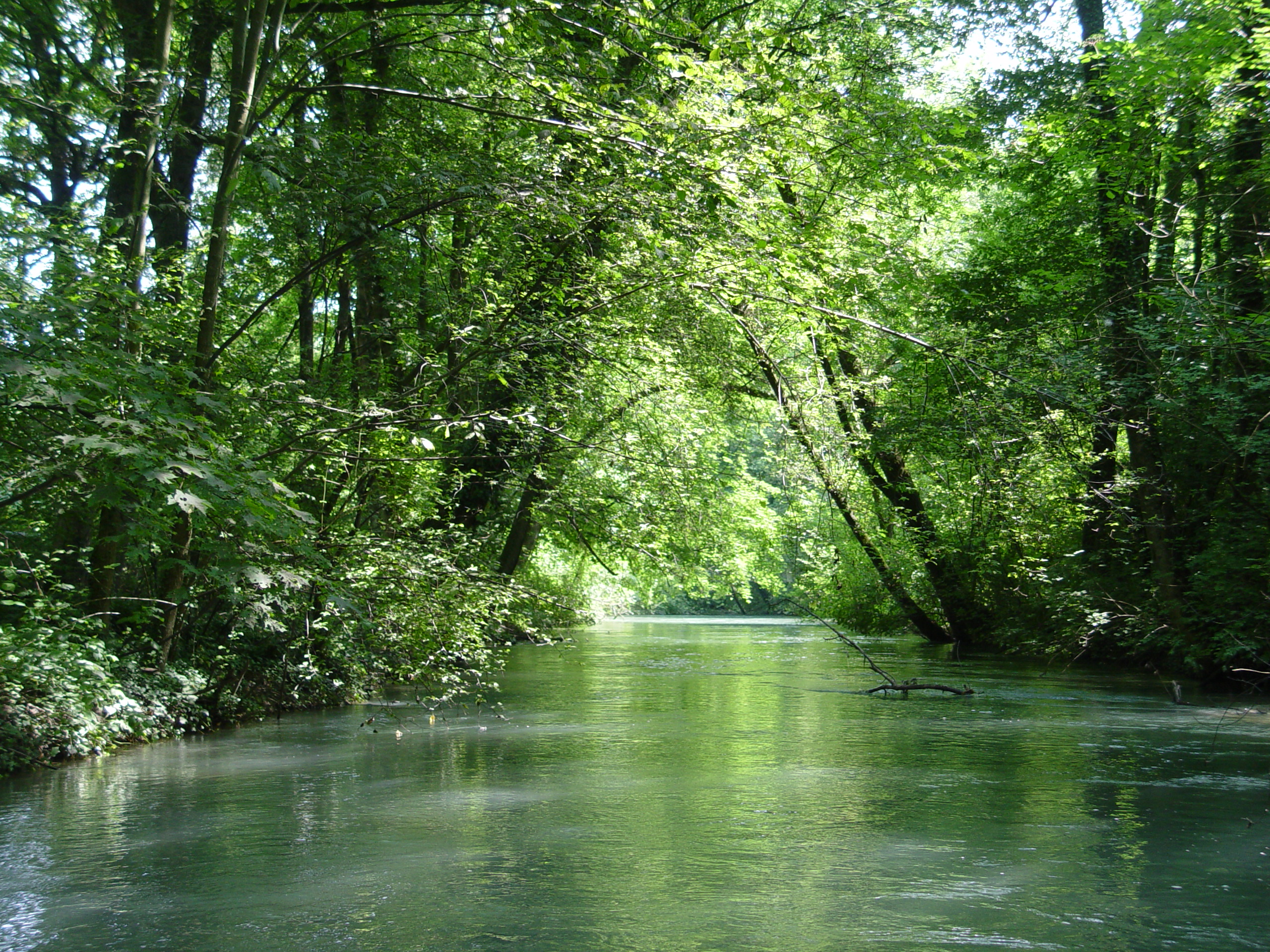
The Aare north of Aarberg

Aerial view by Walter Mittelholzer (1919)

Aarberg has an area of 7.93 km^{2} (3.06 sq mi). Of this area, 3.51 km^{2} (1.36 mi^{2}) or 44.4% is used for agricultural purposes, while 2.34 km^{2} (0.90 mi^{2}) or 29.6% is forested. Of the rest of the land, 1.86 km^{2} (0.72 mi^{2}) or 23.5% is settled (buildings or roads), 0.18 km^{2} (0.069 mi^{2}) or 2.3% is either rivers or lakes and 0.03 km^{2} (7.4 acres) or 0.4% is unproductive land.

Of the built up area, industrial buildings made up 5.8% of the total area while housing and buildings made up 10.0% and transportation infrastructure made up 4.4%. Power and water infrastructure as well as other special developed areas made up 1.1% of the area while parks, green belts and sports fields made up 2.1%. Out of the forested land, 27.9% of the total land area is heavily forested and 1.6% is covered with orchards or small clusters of trees. Of the agricultural land, 36.3% is used for growing crops and 6.7% is pastures, while 1.4% is used for orchards or vine crops. All the water in the municipality is flowing water.

The former district capital is located at the only Aare crossing between Bern and Büren an der Aare. It was an important market town and trans-shipment stop for trade along the river as well as around Bern.

== Coat of arms ==
The blazon of the municipal coat of arms is Argent an Eagle rising Sable beaked and membered Or and langued Gules on a Mount of 3 Coupeaux of the last.

== Demographics ==
Aarberg has a population (as of December 2020) of 4,626. As of 2010, 10.8% of the population are resident foreign nationals. Over the last 10 years (2000–2010) the population has changed at a rate of 7.9%. Migration accounted for 5.9%, while births and deaths accounted for 2.6%.

Most of the population (as of 2000) speaks German (3,442 or 90.5%) as their first language, Italian is the second most common (52 or 1.4%) and Turkish is the third (52 or 1.4%). There are 44 people who speak French and 1 person who speaks Romansh.

As of 2008, the population was 49.5% male and 50.5% female. The population was made up of 1,786 Swiss men (43.7% of the population) and 236 (5.8%) non-Swiss men. There were 1,862 Swiss women (45.5%) and 20 (0.5%) non-Swiss women. Of the population in the municipality, 1,060 or about 27.9% were born in Aarberg and lived there in 2000. There were 1,610 or 42.3% who were born in the same canton, while 516 or 13.6% were born somewhere else in Switzerland, and 499 or 13.1% were born outside of Switzerland.

As of 2000, children and teenagers (0–19 years old) make up 23.6% of the population, while adults (20–64 years old) make up 62% and seniors (over 64 years old) make up 14.4%.

As of 2000, there were 1,581 people who were single and never married in the municipality. There were 1,850 married individuals, 220 widows or widowers and 151 individuals who are divorced.

As of 2000, there were 1,599 private households in the municipality, and an average of 2.3 persons per household. There were 516 households that consist of only one person and 106 households with five or more people. In 2000, a total of 1,513 apartments (91.5% of the total) were permanently occupied, while 102 apartments (6.2%) were seasonally occupied and 38 apartments (2.3%) were empty. As of 2009, the construction rate of new housing units was 10 new units per 1000 residents. The vacancy rate for the municipality, in 2010, was 0.32%.

The historical population is given in the following chart:

== Heritage sites of national significance ==
The covered wooden bridge and the Liechti house are listed as Swiss heritage site of national significance. The entire old town of Aarberg is part of the Inventory of Swiss Heritage Sites.

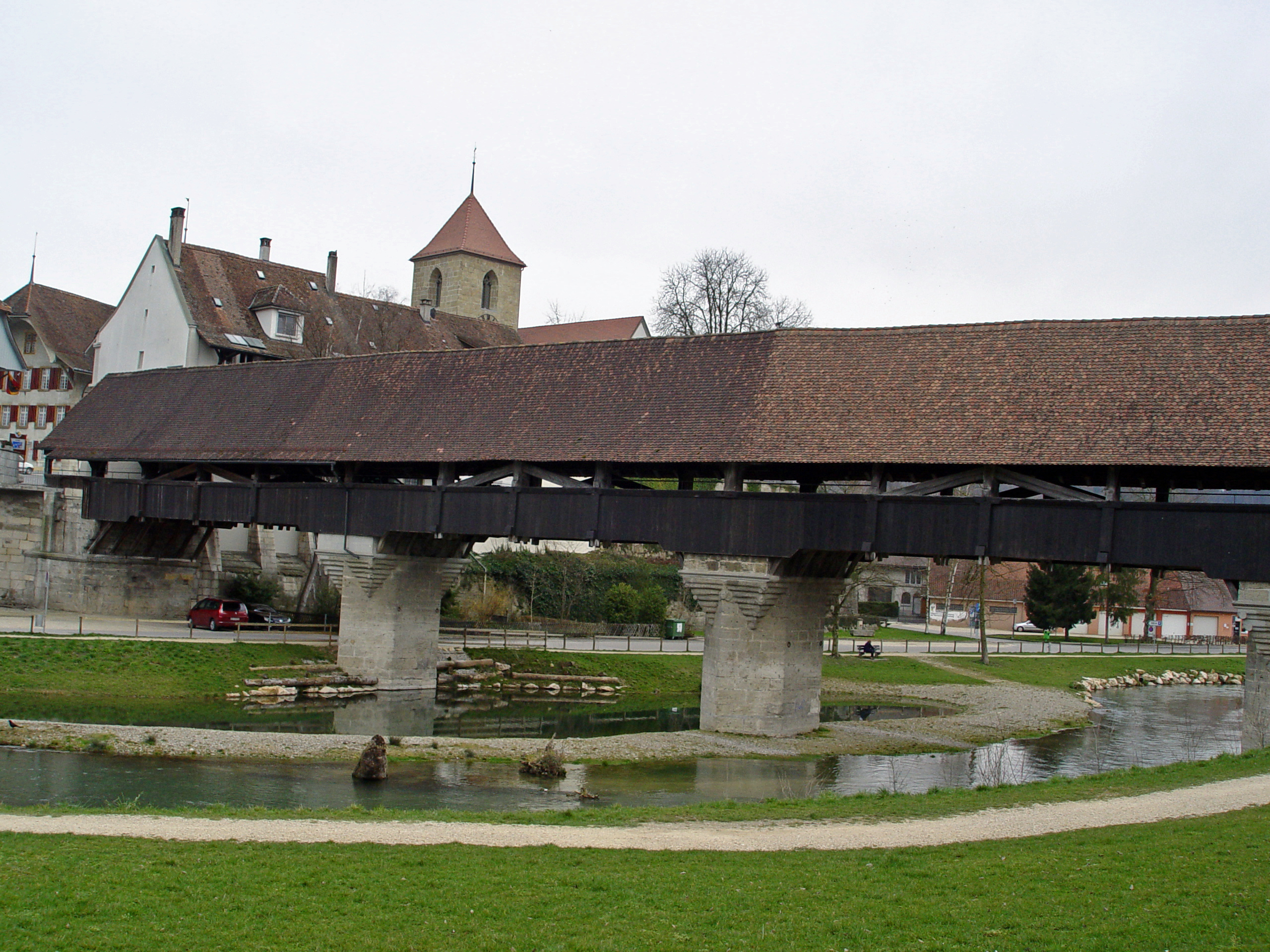
Covered Wooden Bridge

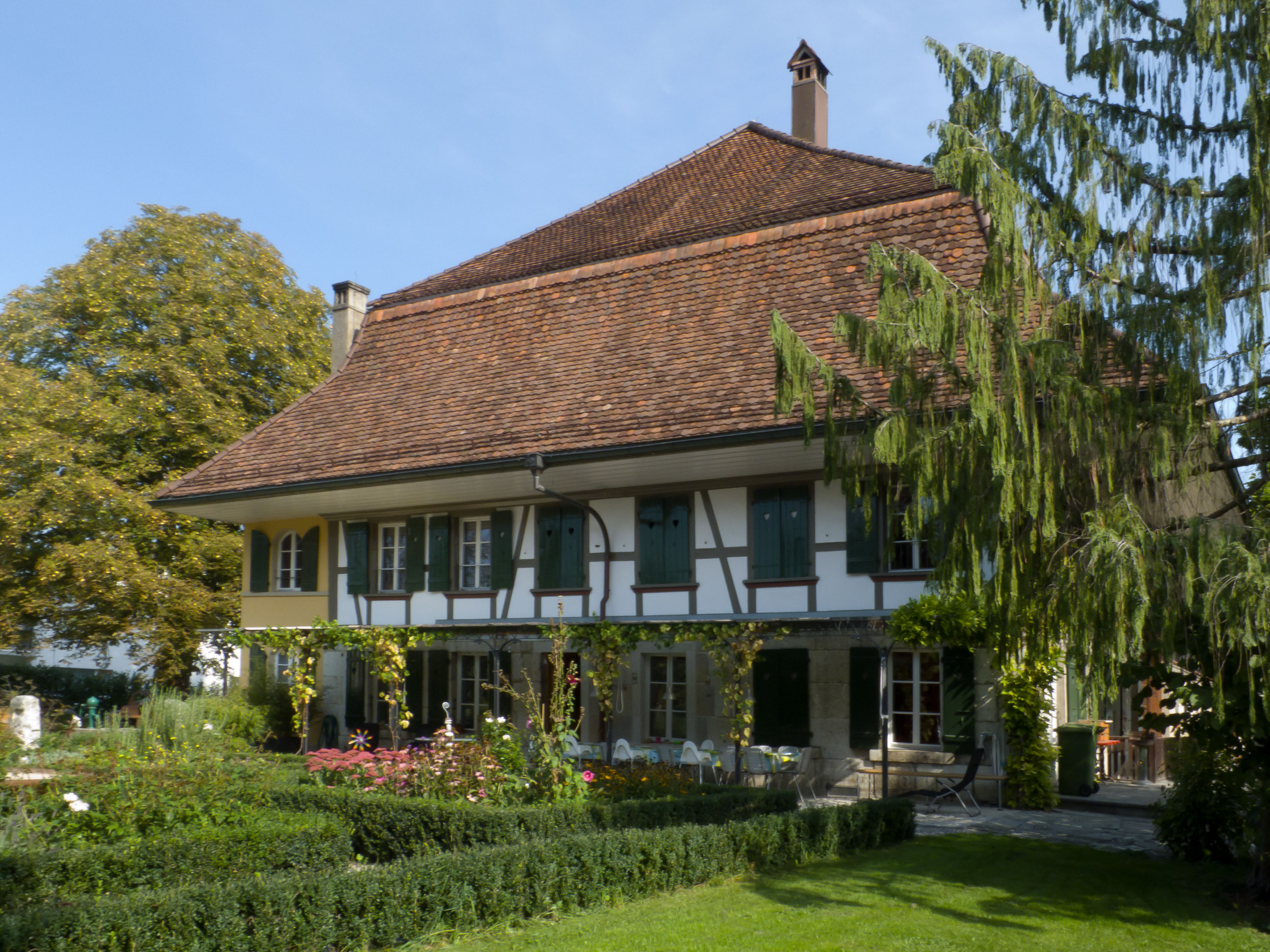
Liechti House

=== Plaza in the Old Town ===
The large round plaza in Aarberg is used for numerous markets, light shows and open-air theatre. One of the most famous markets is the Puce or flea market. It is described as "one of the greatest and most atmospheric flea-markets in Switzerland." Started in 1977, the Puce now has about 250 vendors selling a variety of products. The Puce takes place on the last weekend in April and August.

=== Schloss Aarberg ===
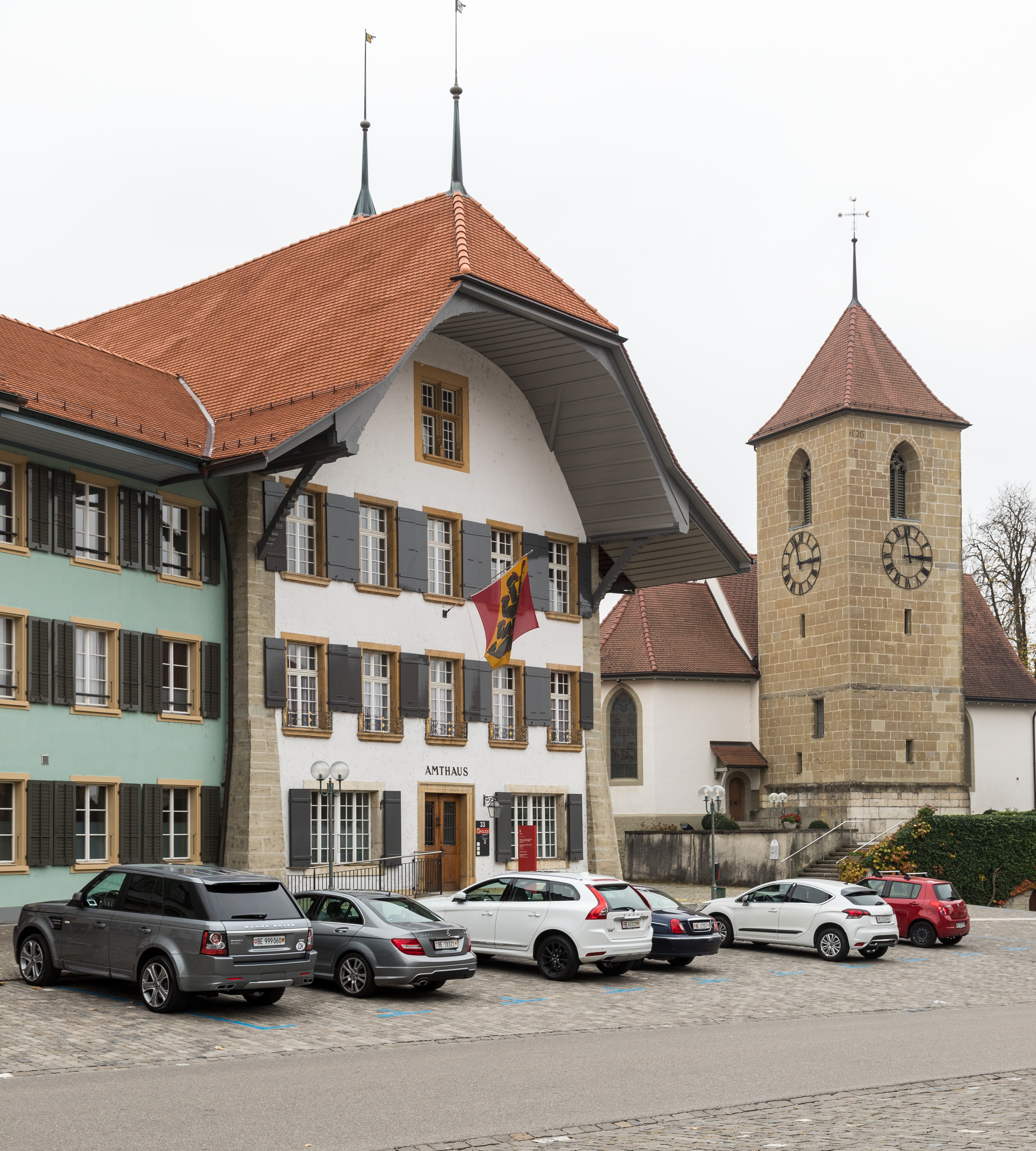
Magistrate's house (Castle) and Reformed Church

Schloss Aarberg was first built in 1220 with the town. From 1358 (when Aarberg was sold) until 1830 around 100 Vögte occupied the castle. Today it is the town hall, Bezirk (county) seat as well as the police station for the Cantonal police. The Hotel Krone is located on the left side of the castle.

=== Church ===
The late Gothic church was built in 1526 and promptly burned down. It was rebuilt in 1576 and is used by the Swiss Reformed Church. The bell tower is one of the tallest buildings in Aarberg. The church is built on a single nave plan with a choir. Both the pulpit and the organ are worth seeing.

=== Siegfried Map ===
In 1880, the Swiss Geodetic Commission measured the 2.4 km long main baseline for the Topographic Atlas of Switzerland along the road from Aarberg to Bargen in the Grand Marais, Seeland.

== Politics ==
In the 2007 federal election the most popular party was the SVP which received 35.87% of the vote. The next three most popular parties were the SPS (21.85%), the FDP (18.41%) and the Green Party (8.79%). In the federal election, a total of 1,334 votes were cast, and the voter turnout was 46.7%.

== Economy ==
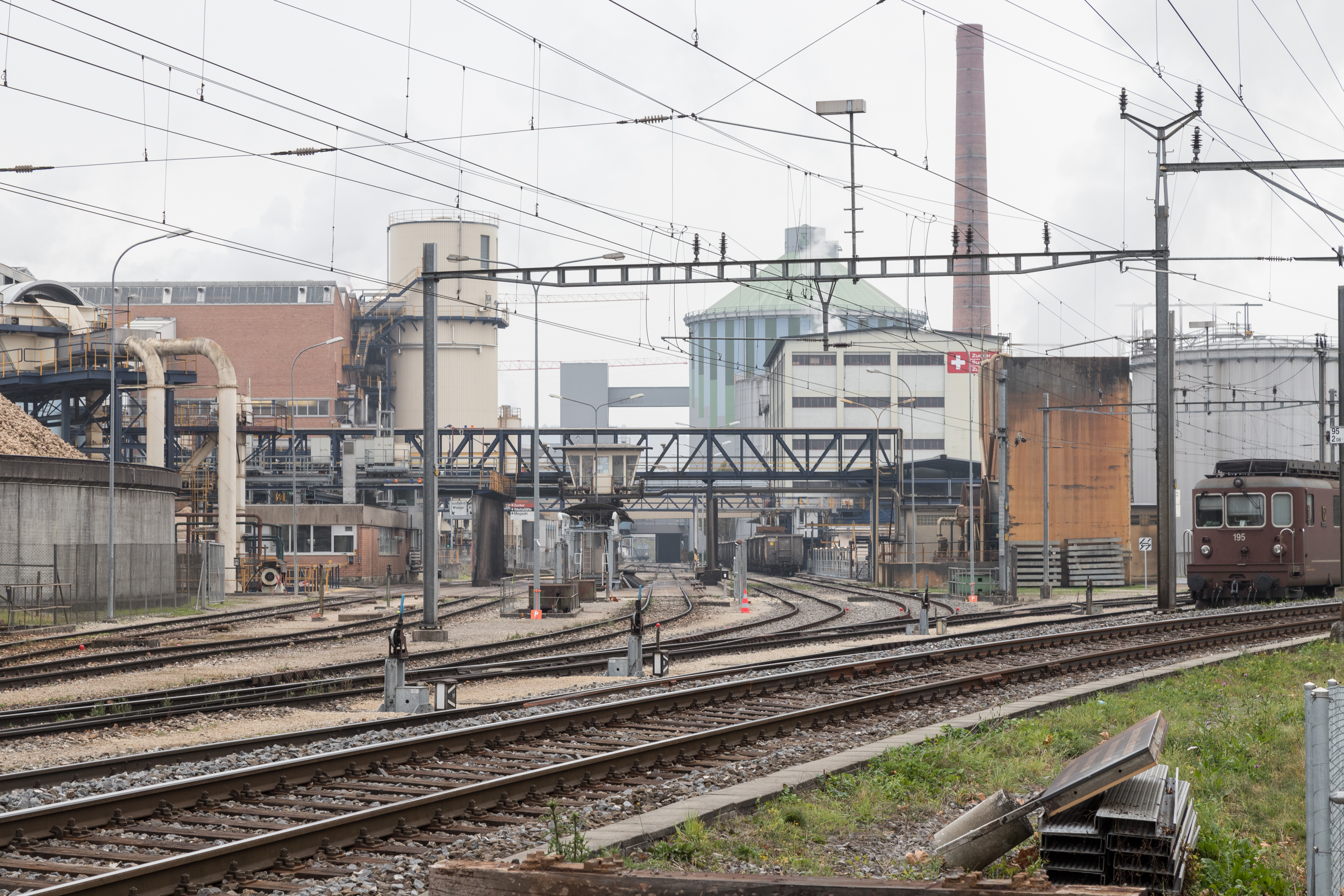
Aarberg sugar factory

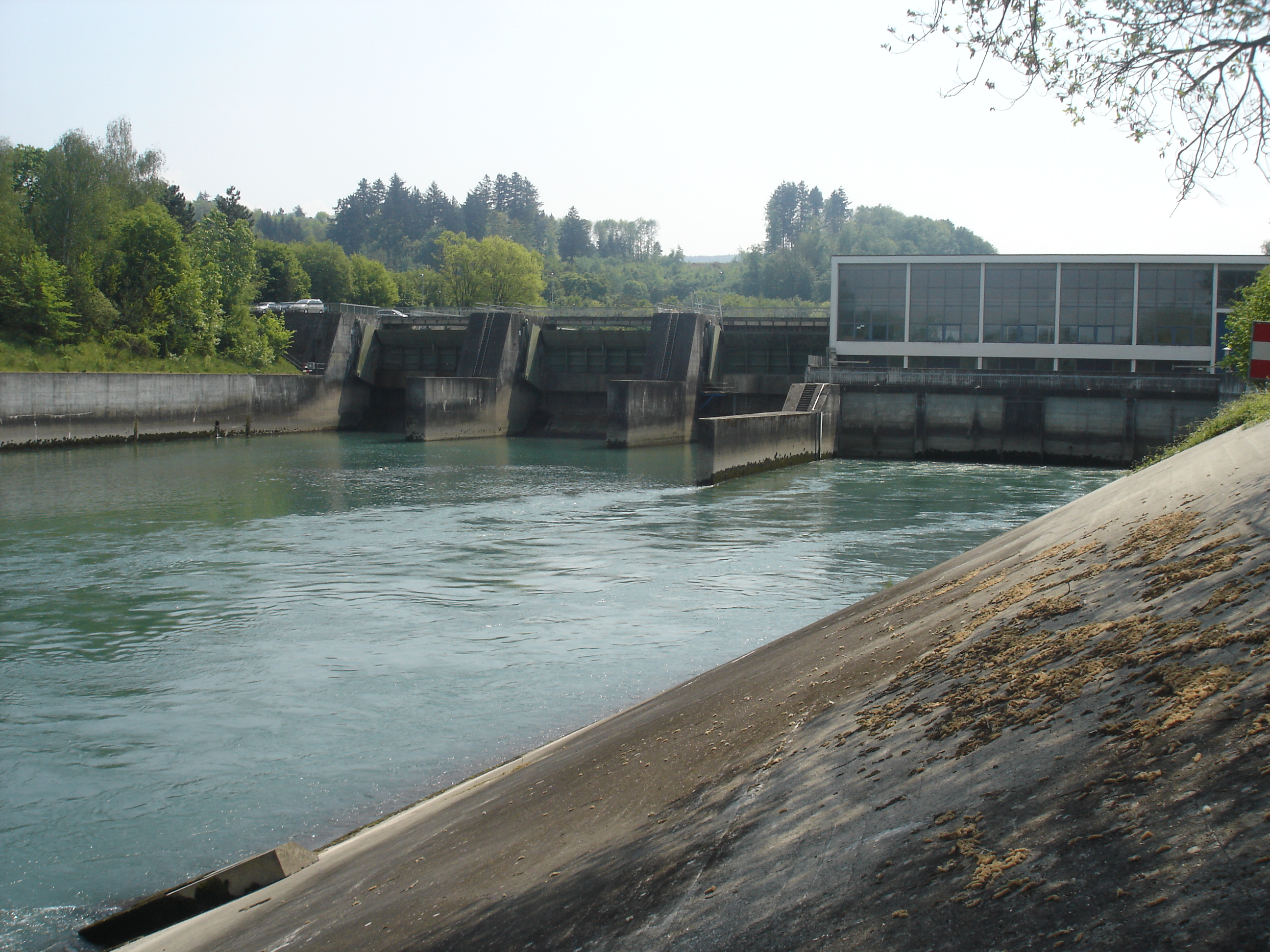
Hydroelectric dam in Aarberg

As of 2010, Aarberg had an unemployment rate of 1.9%. As of 2008, there were 73 people employed in the primary economic sector and about 21 businesses involved in this sector. 847 people were employed in the secondary sector and there were 51 businesses in this sector. 1,509 people were employed in the tertiary sector, with 180 businesses in this sector.

In 2008 the total number of full-time equivalent jobs was 1,941. The number of jobs in the primary sector was 44, all of which were in agriculture. The number of jobs in the secondary sector was 804 of which 671 or (83.5%) were in manufacturing and 81 (10.1%) were in construction. The number of jobs in the tertiary sector was 1,093. In the tertiary sector; 304 or 27.8% were in wholesale or retail sales or the repair of motor vehicles, 26 or 2.4% were in the movement and storage of goods, 96 or 8.8% were in a hotel or restaurant, 11 or 1.0% were in the information industry, 23 or 2.1% were the insurance or financial industry, 65 or 5.9% were technical professionals or scientists, 84 or 7.7% were in education and 355 or 32.5% were in health care.

In 2000, there were 1,692 workers who commuted into the municipality and 1,181 workers who commuted away. The municipality is a net importer of workers, with about 1.4 workers entering the municipality for every one leaving. Of the working population, 13.2% used public transportation to get to work, and 51% used a private car.

== Religion ==
From the 2000 census, 494 or 13.0% were Roman Catholic, while 2,653 or 69.8% belonged to the Swiss Reformed Church. Of the rest of the population, there were 51 members of an Orthodox church (or about 1.34% of the population), and there were 230 individuals (or about 6.05% of the population) who belonged to another Christian church. There were 174 (or about 4.58% of the population) who were Islamic. There were 13 individuals who were Buddhist, 20 individuals who were Hindu and 2 individuals who belonged to another church. 182 (or about 4.79% of the population) belonged to no church, are agnostic or atheist, and 98 individuals (or about 2.58% of the population) did not answer the question.

== Weather ==
Aarberg has an average of 125.3 days of rain or snow per year and on average receives 1,035 mm (40.7 in) of precipitation. The wettest month is June during which time Aarberg receives an average of 110 mm (4.3 in) of rain or snow. During this month there is precipitation for an average of 11.3 days. The month with the most days of precipitation is May, with an average of 12.9, but with only 97 mm (3.8 in) of rain or snow. The driest month of the year is April with an average of 72 mm (2.8 in) of precipitation over 11.2 days.

== Education ==
In Aarberg about 1,622 or (42.7%) of the population have completed non-mandatory upper secondary education, and 477 or (12.5%) have completed additional higher education (either university or a Fachhochschule). Of the 477 who completed tertiary schooling, 71.3% were Swiss men, 22.2% were Swiss women, 3.6% were non-Swiss men and 2.9% were non-Swiss women.

The Canton of Bern school system provides one year of non-obligatory Kindergarten, followed by six years of Primary school. This is followed by three years of obligatory lower Secondary school where the students are separated according to ability and aptitude. Following the lower Secondary students may attend additional schooling or they may enter an apprenticeship.

During the 2009–10 school year, there were a total of 685 students attending classes in Aarberg. There were 4 kindergarten classes with a total of 73 students in the municipality. Of the kindergarten students, 15.1% were permanent or temporary residents of Switzerland (not citizens) and 19.2% have a different mother language than the classroom language. The municipality had 17 primary classes and 271 students. Of the primary students, 14.4% were permanent or temporary residents of Switzerland (not citizens) and 15.1% have a different mother language than the classroom language. During the same year, there were 18 lower secondary classes with a total of 341 students. There were 10.6% who were permanent or temporary residents of Switzerland (not citizens) and 12.6% have a different mother language than the classroom language. As of 2000, there were 249 students in Aarberg who came from another municipality, while 118 residents attended schools outside the municipality.

Aarberg is home to the Gemeindebibliothek Aarberg (municipal library of Aarberg). The library has (as of 2008) 12,913 books or other media, and loaned out 38,997 items in the same year. It was open a total of 121 days with average of 14 hours per week during that year.

== Transportation ==
The municipality has a railway station, Aarberg, on the Palézieux–Lyss railway line. It has regular service to Kerzers and Lyss. On top of that it has multiple busses to the nearest bigger towns: - Nr. 86 to Biel/Bienne - Nr. 100 to Berne - Nr. 365 to Seedorf (Connection onto the Nr. 105 to Berne/Lyss) - Nr. 361 to Lyss.

== Notable people ==
- Theodor Gohl (1844 in Aarberg - 1910) a Swiss architect
- Kurt Wüthrich (born 1938 in Aarberg) a Swiss chemist/biophysicist and Nobel Chemistry laureate, known for developing nuclear magnetic resonance (NMR) methods
- Andreas Fuhrer (born 1959) a retired Swiss sidecarcross rider and four times World Champion 1993–1996, lives in Aarberg
- Thomas Bickel (born 1963 in Aarberg) a retired Swiss football midfielder
- Martin Laciga (born 1975 in Aarberg) a retired beach volleyball player
