= Frienisberg Abbey =

Coordinates: 47.0271°N 7.3319°E

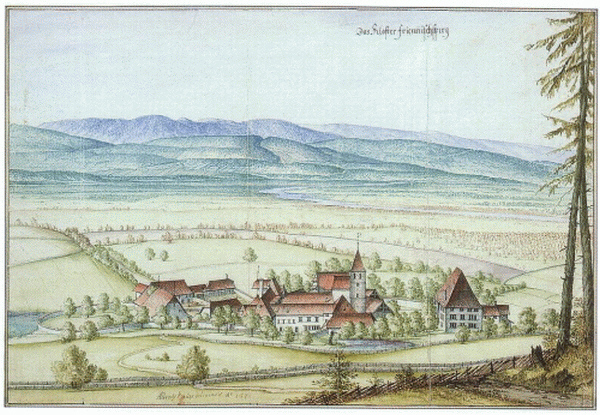
Frienisberg Abbey in 1670

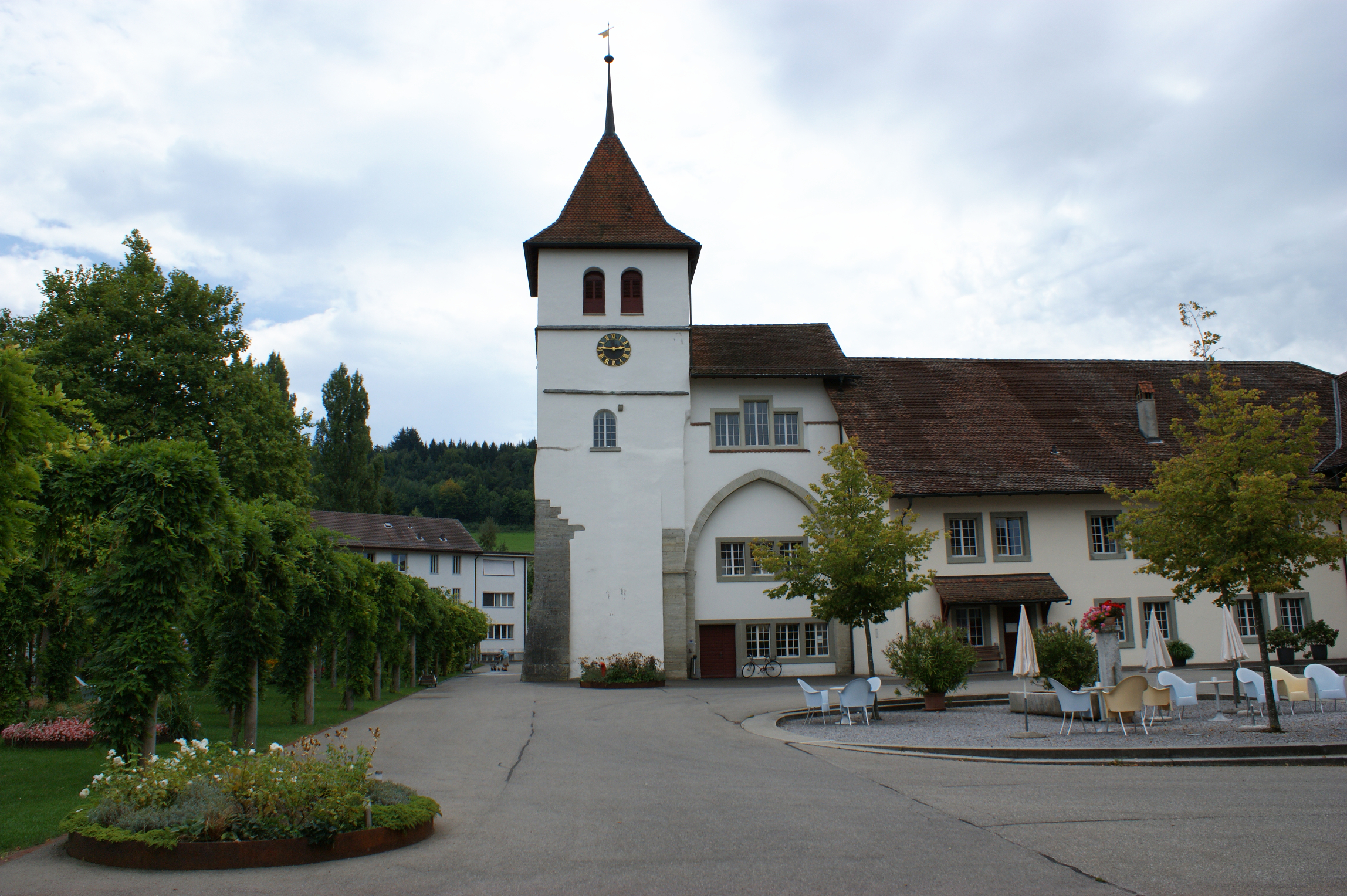
Yard of Frienisberg nursing home with the tower of the former abbey.

Frienisberg Abbey is a former Cistercian religious house in the Swiss municipality of Seedorf in the Canton of Bern.

== History ==
In 1131 Count Udelhard of Saugern granted his land at Frienisberg to the Cistercian Lützel Abbey. In 1138, the Lützel Abbey sent settlers to Frienisberg to found a new abbey. The new abbey remained small and struggled until the first half of the 13th century, when a number of donations allowed it to expand. In 1233 it owned land in Frienisberg, Allenwil, Ried, Tedlingen, Niederwiler, Werd, Gäserz bei Ins and Montils bei Nugerol. At its peak, about 300 farmers worked 5,000 Juchart (a measurement of acreage related to the Roman Jugerum, 1 Juchart was .36 hectares [0.89 acres] for a total of 1,800 hectares [4,400 acres]) in 45 villages west of Bern. It also owned vineyards on the shores of Lake Biel and had 282 men working on the vines. Finally it controlled the patronage and the right to appoint parish priests in Rapperswil, Seedorf, Nieder-Lyss, Bargen, Schüpfen and Grossaffoltern.

Initially, the majority of the Abbey's income came from rents or produce from its farms and estates. Starting in the middle of the 13th century the economy of the monastery began to slowly change. It moved away from land rents and now began to survive on tithes and offerings. In the second half of the 13th century, the abbey founded the nunneries of Fraubrunnen, Steinen and Tedlingen.

In 1386, the Abbey tied itself closely to Bern, when it accepted Bernese citizenship for its monks and farmers. This close connection with Bern led to the Abbey's downfall. When Bern embraced the Protestant Reformation, many Bernese monasteries, including Frienisberg, were secularized. The last abbot, Urs Hirsinger, fled to Hauterive in the Canton of Fribourg rather than remain in Bern. In 1534, the abbey church was demolished. The former convent building was converted into a hospital in 1533 and it housed the local Bernese bailiff until 1798. In 1834 it was converted into a home for the deaf-mute. In 1889 it was converted into a nursing home, a role that it still fills today.
