= Erlach District =

Coordinates: 47°2′25″N 7°5′46″E

Erlach District Amtsbezirk Erlach
- District
- Flag Coat of arms

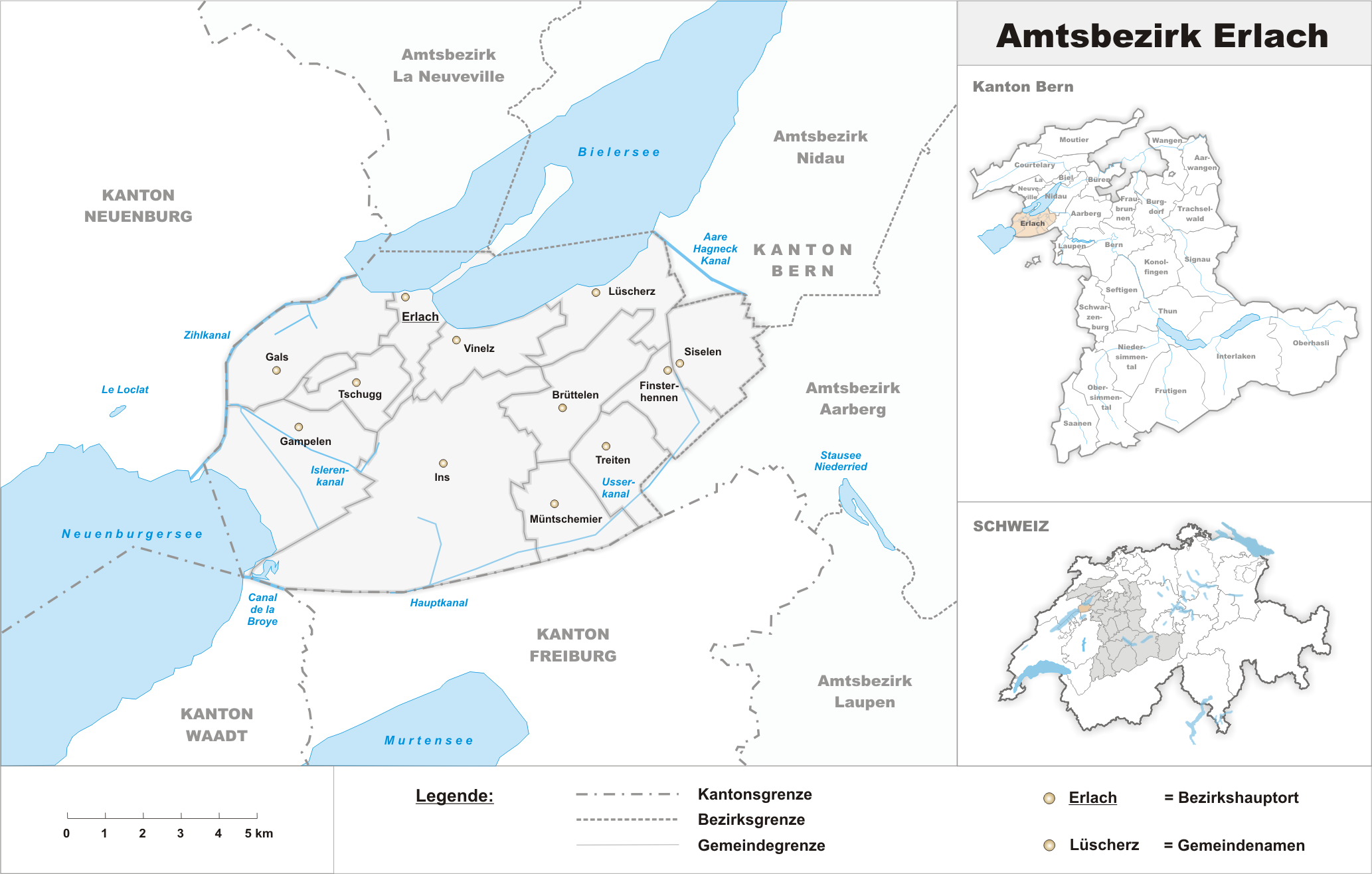
- Country: Switzerland
- Canton: Bern
- Capital: Erlach

Area
  - Total: 85 km^{2} (33 sq mi)

Population (2007)
  - Total: 10,734
  - Density: 130/km^{2} (330/sq mi)
- Time zone: UTC+1 (CET)
  - Summer (DST): UTC+2 (CEST)
- Municipalities: 12

Erlach District is a constitutional district in the canton of Bern, Switzerland. Its capital is Erlach.

From 1 January 2010, the district lost its administrative power while being replaced by the Seeland (administrative district), whose administrative centre is Aarberg. Since 2010, it remains a fully recognised district under the law and the Constitution (Art.3 al.2) of the Canton of Berne.

The district has an area of 96 km^{2} and consists of 12 municipalities:

Municipality	Population (Jan 2005)	Area (km^{2})
Brüttelen	623	6.6
Erlach	1,111	3.5
Finsterhennen	442	3.6
Gals	686	7.9
Gampelen	757	10.8
Ins	2,927	23.9
Lüscherz	539	5.4
Müntschemier	1181	4.9
Siselen	596	5.5
Treiten	412	4.7
Tschugg	452	3.3
Vinelz	777	4.6
