= Gäserz =

Former municipality in Bern, Switzerland

- Former municipality
- Location of Gäserz
- Location within Switzerland Location within Canton of Bern
- Coordinates: 47.0321°N 7.1577°E
- Country: Switzerland
- Canton: Bern
- Municipality: Brüttelen

Population (1910)
  - Total: 39
- Time zone: UTC+01:00 (CET)
  - Summer (DST): UTC+02:00 (CEST)
- ISO 3166 code: CH-BE
- Website

Gäserz is a former municipality in the canton of Bern, Switzerland, and today a hamlet in the municipality of Brüttelen, into which it was incorporated in 1917.

== History ==
The open-field hamlet (Zelgweiler) of Gäserz, above the Grosses Moos, arose from the division of a medieval farm of Frienisberg Abbey, mentioned in 1250 as the curtis de Gesarz, and later formed part of the estate of Erlach Castle. It had three households in 1598, 39 inhabitants in 1910 and about 60 in 2002.

Its sources of livelihood were viticulture and arable farming, the fattening of pigs in the forests of Erlach (a privilege of 1479), and a share in the intercommunal pasture on the Moos. With Brüttelen, Gäserz belonged to the parish of Ins, but it maintained a school of its own. In 1917 the small municipality reluctantly submitted to its incorporation into Brüttelen, which had been ordered by a decree of the Grand Council. The citizens' community (Burgergemeinde) of Gäserz continues to exist.

== Bibliography ==
- H.-R. Egli, Die Herrschaft Erlach, 1983
