= Siselen =

- Municipality
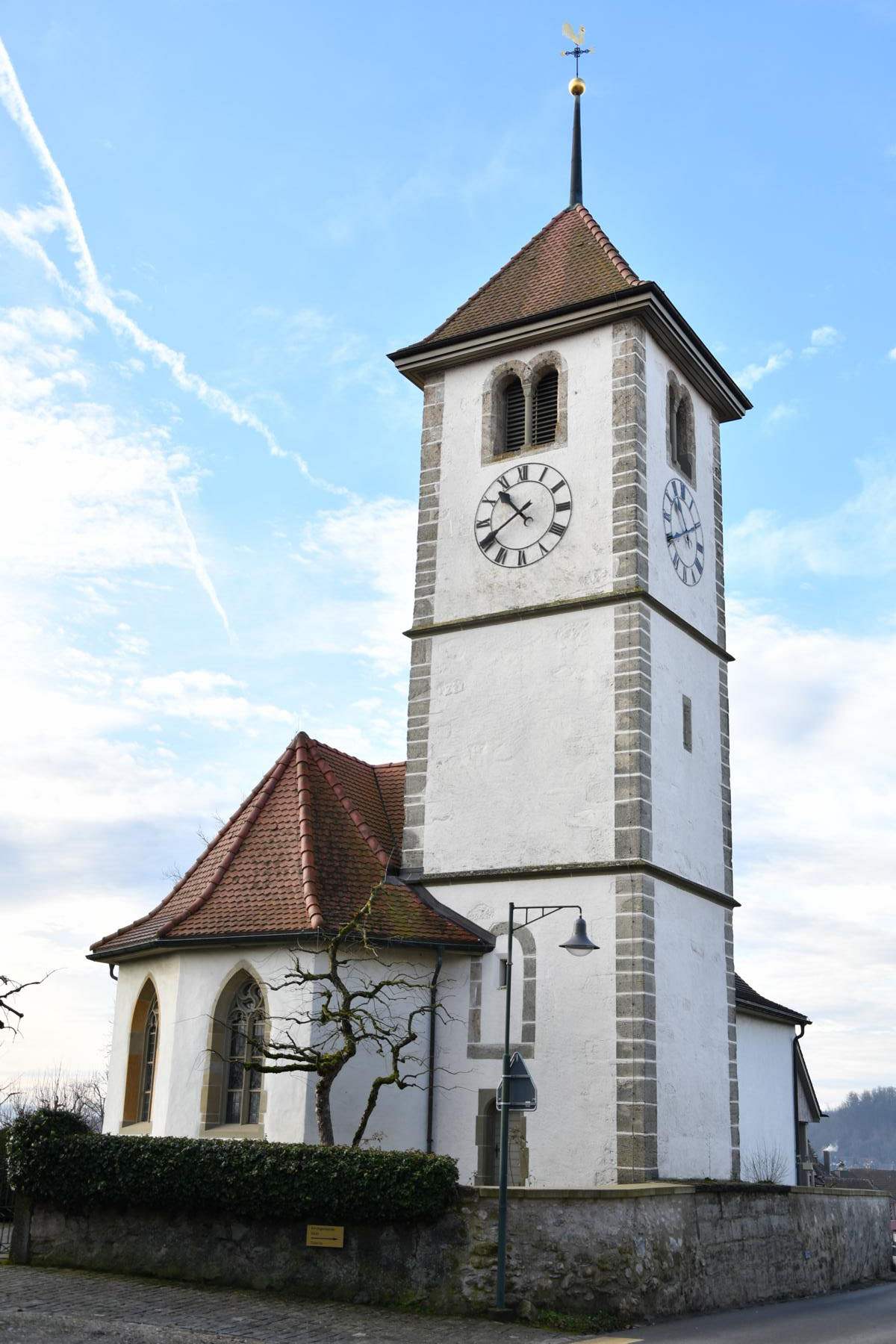
- Siselen village Reformed church

- Flag Coat of arms
- Location of Siselen
- Location within Switzerland Location within Canton of Bern
- Coordinates: 47°1′N 7°11′E
- Country: Switzerland
- Canton: Bern
- District: Seeland

Area
  - Total: 5.5 km^{2} (2.1 sq mi)
- Elevation: 460 m (1,510 ft)

Population (December 2020)
  - Total: 612
  - Density: 110/km^{2} (290/sq mi)
- Time zone: UTC+01:00 (CET)
  - Summer (DST): UTC+02:00 (CEST)
- Postal code: 2577
- SFOS number: 499
- ISO 3166 code: CH-BE
- Surrounded by: Bargen, Finsterhennen, Hagneck, Kallnach, Lüscherz, Walperswil
- Website: www.siselen.ch

Siselen is a municipality in the Seeland administrative district in the canton of Bern in Switzerland.

== History ==
Siselen is first mentioned about 1160 as Sisilli.

The oldest trace of a settlement in the area are scattered, individual items from the Bronze Age and a Hallstatt grave. During the Middle Ages, the village and the patronage rights over the village church were owned by the Counts of Neuchâtel-Nidau. In 1388 the village was acquired by Bern and became part of the Bernese bailiwick of Nidau. In 1803 it was transferred, against the villagers will, to the Erlach District.

The village church was first mentioned in 1225. The current church of St. Silvester was built in 1500 and rebuilt or renovated several times between the 17th and 20th centuries.

The village grew up along the Ins-Aarberg road. In addition to crops, the villagers tended vineyards. In 1516 they received the right to charge tolls on the Ins-Aarberg road and to use the tolls to maintain the road. A village charter was first written in 1736. The Jura water correction project of 1874 drained the marshy Grosses Moos and allowed farming of the rich soil. However, rising water levels required a second water correction project in 1970-87. The Biel-Täuffelen-Ins railroad built a station in the village in 1916. The village has remained generally agrarian, with, in 2005, nearly half of all jobs in agriculture.

== Geography ==
Siselen has an area of 5.51 km^{2} (2.13 sq mi). Of this area, 4.08 km^{2} (1.58 mi^{2}) or 73.9% is used for agricultural purposes, while 1.03 km^{2} (0.40 mi^{2}) or 18.7% is forested. Of the rest of the land, 0.39 km^{2} (0.15 mi^{2}) or 7.1% is settled (buildings or roads), 0.01 km^{2} (2.5 acres) or 0.2% is either rivers or lakes and 0.02 km^{2} (4.9 acres) or 0.4% is unproductive land.

Of the built up area, housing and buildings made up 3.1% and transportation infrastructure made up 3.1%. Out of the forested land, 17.0% of the total land area is heavily forested and 1.6% is covered with orchards or small clusters of trees. Of the agricultural land, 70.1% is used for growing crops and 3.3% is pastures. All the water in the municipality is flowing water.

The municipality is located on a moraine at the northern edge of the Grosses Moos marsh. It consists of the linear village of Siselen.

On 31 December 2009 Amtsbezirk Erlach, the municipality's former district, was dissolved. On the following day, 1 January 2010, it joined the newly created Verwaltungskreis Seeland.

== Coat of arms ==
The blazon of the municipal coat of arms is Gules an Arrowhead Argent.

== Demographics ==
Siselen has a population (as of December 2020) of 612. As of 2010, 8.2% of the population are resident foreign nationals. Over the last 10 years (2000-2010) the population has changed at a rate of -11.1%. Migration accounted for -5%, while births and deaths accounted for -4.6%.

Most of the population (as of 2000) speaks German (581 or 94.9%) as their first language, Albanian is the second most common (12 or 2.0%) and Portuguese is the third (5 or 0.8%). There is 1 person who speaks French and 1 person who speaks Italian.

As of 2008, the population was 50.9% male and 49.1% female. The population was made up of 263 Swiss men (46.1% of the population) and 27 (4.7%) non-Swiss men. There were 260 Swiss women (45.6%) and 20 (3.5%) non-Swiss women. Of the population in the municipality, 269 or about 44.0% were born in Siselen and lived there in 2000. There were 227 or 37.1% who were born in the same canton, while 58 or 9.5% were born somewhere else in Switzerland, and 46 or 7.5% were born outside of Switzerland.

As of 2010, children and teenagers (0–19 years old) make up 21.8% of the population, while adults (20–64 years old) make up 57.7% and seniors (over 64 years old) make up 20.5%.

As of 2000, there were 234 people who were single and never married in the municipality. There were 338 married individuals, 37 widows or widowers and 3 individuals who are divorced.

As of 2000, there were 64 households that consist of only one person and 25 households with five or more people. In 2000, a total of 228 apartments (90.1% of the total) were permanently occupied, while 12 apartments (4.7%) were seasonally occupied and 13 apartments (5.1%) were empty. As of 2010, the construction rate of new housing units was 5.3 new units per 1000 residents.

The historical population is given in the following chart:

== Heritage sites of national significance ==
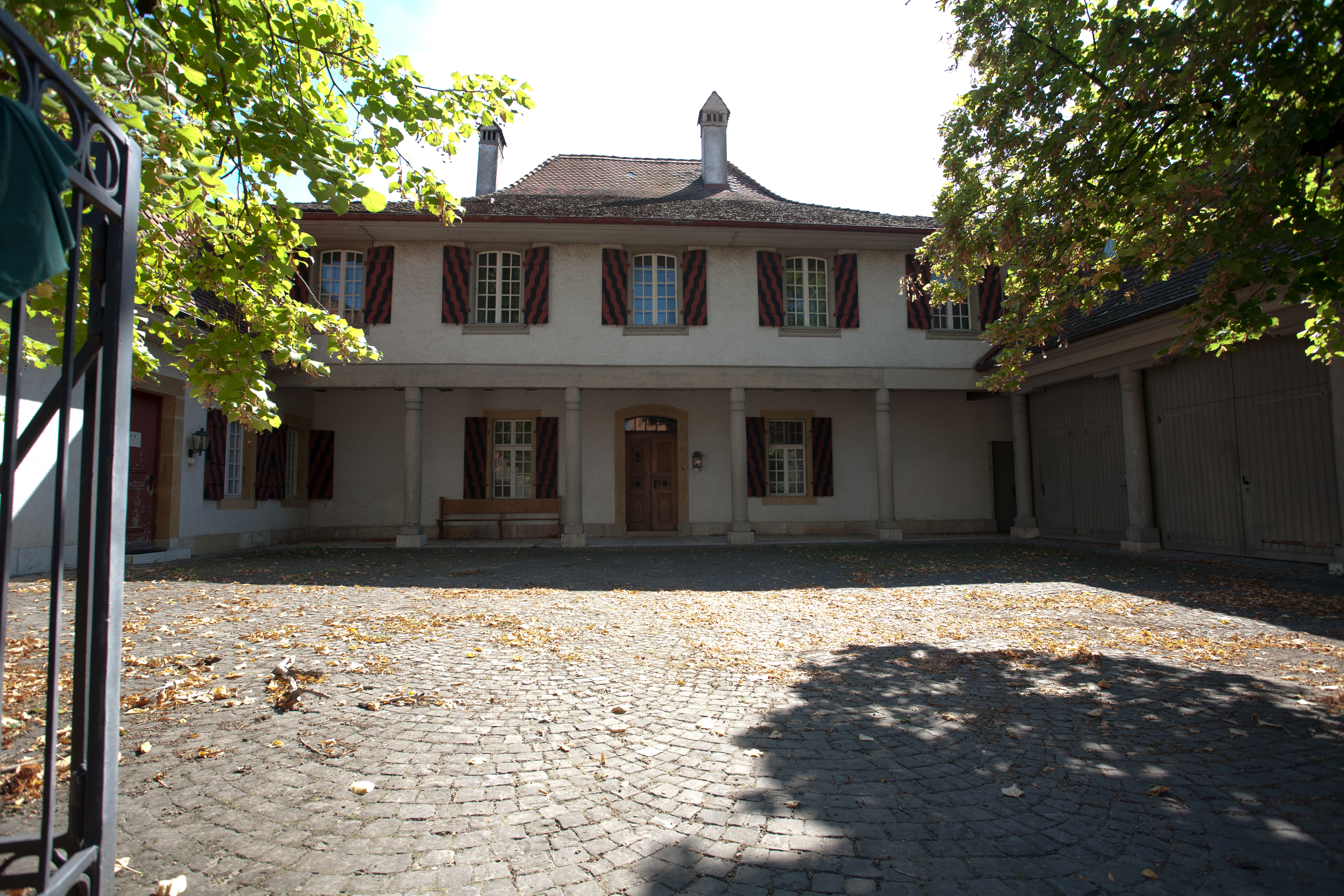
Siselen rectory

The rectory is listed as a Swiss heritage site of national significance. The entire village of Siselen is part of the Inventory of Swiss Heritage Sites.

== Politics ==
In the 2011 federal election the most popular party was the Swiss People's Party (SVP) which received 43.6% of the vote. The next three most popular parties were the Conservative Democratic Party (BDP) (19.3%), the Social Democratic Party (SP) (16.5%) and the FDP.The Liberals (5.8%). In the federal election, a total of 220 votes were cast, and the voter turnout was 48.0%.

== Economy ==
As of 2011, Siselen had an unemployment rate of 1.6%. As of 2008, there were a total of 243 people employed in the municipality. Of these, there were 99 people employed in the primary economic sector and about 25 businesses involved in this sector. 71 people were employed in the secondary sector and there were 7 businesses in this sector. 73 people were employed in the tertiary sector, with 22 businesses in this sector. There were 316 residents of the municipality who were employed in some capacity, of which females made up 40.2% of the workforce.

In 2008 there were a total of 179 full-time equivalent jobs. The number of jobs in the primary sector was 61, all of which were in agriculture. The number of jobs in the secondary sector was 64 of which 43 or (67.2%) were in manufacturing and 21 (32.8%) were in construction. The number of jobs in the tertiary sector was 54. In the tertiary sector; 27 or 50.0% were in wholesale or retail sales or the repair of motor vehicles, 8 or 14.8% were in the movement and storage of goods, 2 or 3.7% were in a hotel or restaurant, 1 was in the information industry, 4 or 7.4% were technical professionals or scientists, 6 or 11.1% were in education.

In 2000, there were 35 workers who commuted into the municipality and 184 workers who commuted away. The municipality is a net exporter of workers, with about 5.3 workers leaving the municipality for every one entering. Of the working population, 11.1% used public transportation to get to work, and 48.1% used a private car.

== Religion ==
From the 2000 census, 47 or 7.7% were Roman Catholic, while 505 or 82.5% belonged to the Swiss Reformed Church. Of the rest of the population, there were 3 members of an Orthodox church (or about 0.49% of the population), and there were 22 individuals (or about 3.59% of the population) who belonged to another Christian church. There were 16 (or about 2.61% of the population) who were Islamic. 14 (or about 2.29% of the population) belonged to no church, are agnostic or atheist, and 15 individuals (or about 2.45% of the population) did not answer the question.

== Education ==
In Siselen about 242 or (39.5%) of the population have completed non-mandatory upper secondary education, and 47 or (7.7%) have completed additional higher education (either university or a Fachhochschule). Of the 47 who completed tertiary schooling, 80.9% were Swiss men, 17.0% were Swiss women.

The Canton of Bern school system provides one year of non-obligatory Kindergarten, followed by six years of Primary school. This is followed by three years of obligatory lower Secondary school where the students are separated according to ability and aptitude. Following the lower Secondary students may attend additional schooling or they may enter an apprenticeship.

During the 2010-11 school year, there were a total of 47 students attending classes in Siselen. There was one kindergarten class with a total of 11 students in the municipality. Of the kindergarten students, 27.3% were permanent or temporary residents of Switzerland (not citizens) and 18.2% have a different mother language than the classroom language. The municipality had 2 primary classes and 36 students. Of the primary students, 22.2% were permanent or temporary residents of Switzerland (not citizens) and 16.7% have a different mother language than the classroom language.

As of 2000, there were 14 students in Siselen who came from another municipality, while 53 residents attended schools outside the municipality.
