= Marai (name) =

Marai, Márai may refer to the following people:

Given name

- Marai Al-Awaji (born 1973), Saudi football referee

Surname

- Carmen Marai, Chilean poet and novelist
- Montaser Marai, Palestinian-Jordanian journalist and documentary filmmaker
- Mpitsa Marai (born 1980), Mosotho footballer
- Sándor Márai (1900–1989), Hungarian writer and journalist

== See also ==
- Marei (name)
- Marais (given name)
- Marais (surname)
