= Marei =

Marei may refer to

- Marei (name)
- Marai Parai, or Marei Parei, a plateau in Malaysia
- Ulli and Marei, a 1948 Austrian drama film
- Centre for Marine and Renewable Energy (MaREI), Irish research center

== See also ==
- Marai (disambiguation)
