= Treiten =

- Municipality
- Flag Coat of arms
- Location of Treiten
- Location within Switzerland Location within Canton of Bern
- Coordinates: 47°0′N 7°9′E
- Country: Switzerland
- Canton: Bern
- District: Seeland

Area
  - Total: 4.7 km^{2} (1.8 sq mi)
- Elevation: 442 m (1,450 ft)

Population (Dec 2011)
  - Total: 434
  - Density: 92/km^{2} (240/sq mi)
- Time zone: UTC+01:00 (CET)
  - Summer (DST): UTC+02:00 (CEST)
- Postal code: 3226
- SFOS number: 500
- ISO 3166 code: CH-BE
- Surrounded by: Brüttelen, Finsterhennen, Kallnach, Kerzers (FR), Müntschemier
- Website: http://www.treiten.ch SFSO statistics

Treiten (French: Treiteron) is a municipality in the Seeland administrative district in the canton of Bern in Switzerland.

== History ==
Treiten is first mentioned in 1221 as Treiton.

The five hills around the village were the site of a number of Mesolithic camps. A number of Neolithic and Bronze Age items have been discovered at Buchholz, Ryfflirain-Riederen and Kanalmühle. Fragments of Roman era bricks were found in the Grammetwald. The village was originally part of the Herrschaft of Erlach. In 1474 the entire Herrschaft was acquired by Bern. Under Bernese rule, Treiten was part of the Ins court in the Erlach district. In 1852 the political municipality and the Bürgergemeinde of Treiten merged into a single body.

The agricultural village grew up along the Ins-Aarberg road. In 1647 the Aarberg canal was dug through the village. Almost ten years later, in 1656, a mill was built on the canal. The Jura water correction project of 1874-83 drained the marshy Grosses Moos and Treiten was assigned 155 hectares (380 acres) of the newly arable land. Between 1945 and 1972 several plans were developed to build the Grosses Moos Intercontinental Airport in the municipalities of Treiten and Finsterhennen. The project was eventually abandoned and the area of the proposed airport reverted to farm land.

== Geography ==
Treiten has an area of 4.74 km^{2} (1.83 sq mi). Of this area, 3.46 km^{2} (1.34 mi^{2}) or 72.7% is used for agricultural purposes, while 0.81 km^{2} (0.31 mi^{2}) or 17.0% is forested. Of the rest of the land, 0.39 km^{2} (0.15 mi^{2}) or 8.2% is settled (buildings or roads), 0.06 km^{2} (15 acres) or 1.3% is either rivers or lakes and 0.02 km^{2} (4.9 acres) or 0.4% is unproductive land.

Of the built up area, housing and buildings made up 2.5% and transportation infrastructure made up 2.9%. Power and water infrastructure as well as other special developed areas made up 2.5% of the area Out of the forested land, 16.0% of the total land area is heavily forested and 1.1% is covered with orchards or small clusters of trees. Of the agricultural land, 69.7% is used for growing crops and 2.5% is pastures. All the water in the municipality is flowing water.

The municipality is located at the foot of a moraine that crosses the Grosses Moos marsh.

On 31 December 2009 Amtsbezirk Erlach, the municipality's former district, was dissolved. On the following day, 1 January 2010, it joined the newly created Verwaltungskreis Seeland.

== Coat of arms ==
The blazon of the municipal coat of arms is Argent a bend sinister wavy Azure and overall a Tau Cross couped Sable issuant from a Mount of 3 Coupeaux Vert. The Tau cross on the coat of arms is also a "T" which represents the village's name.

== Demographics ==
Treiten has a population (as of December 2020) of 429. As of 2010, 5.5% of the population are resident foreign nationals. Over the last 10 years (2000-2010) the population has changed at a rate of 5%. Migration accounted for 9%, while births and deaths accounted for -2.3%.

Most of the population (as of 2000) speaks German (377 or 95.4%) as their first language, French is the second most common (8 or 2.0%) and Albanian is the third (5 or 1.3%).

As of 2008, the population was 51.8% male and 48.2% female. The population was made up of 205 Swiss men (48.7% of the population) and 13 (3.1%) non-Swiss men. There were 193 Swiss women (45.8%) and 10 (2.4%) non-Swiss women. Of the population in the municipality, 189 or about 47.8% were born in Treiten and lived there in 2000. There were 118 or 29.9% who were born in the same canton, while 66 or 16.7% were born somewhere else in Switzerland, and 13 or 3.3% were born outside of Switzerland.

As of 2010, children and teenagers (0–19 years old) make up 22.8% of the population, while adults (20–64 years old) make up 60.8% and seniors (over 64 years old) make up 16.4%.

As of 2000, there were 148 people who were single and never married in the municipality. There were 213 married individuals, 29 widows or widowers and 5 individuals who are divorced.

As of 2000, there were 50 households that consist of only one person and 16 households with five or more people. In 2000, a total of 152 apartments (93.8% of the total) were permanently occupied, while 5 apartments (3.1%) were seasonally occupied and 5 apartments (3.1%) were empty.

The historical population is given in the following chart:

== Politics ==
In the 2011 federal election the most popular party was the Swiss People's Party (SVP) which received 43.2% of the vote. The next three most popular parties were the Conservative Democratic Party (BDP) (28.2%), the Social Democratic Party (SP) (6.4%) and the Evangelical People's Party (EVP) (4.8%). In the federal election, a total of 190 votes were cast, and the voter turnout was 58.8%.

== Economy ==
As of 2011, Treiten had an unemployment rate of 1.81%. As of 2008, there were a total of 157 people employed in the municipality. Of these, there were 109 people employed in the primary economic sector and about 22 businesses involved in this sector. 21 people were employed in the secondary sector and there were 4 businesses in this sector. 27 people were employed in the tertiary sector, with 9 businesses in this sector. There were 224 residents of the municipality who were employed in some capacity, of which females made up 42.9% of the workforce.

In 2008 there were a total of 120 full-time equivalent jobs. The number of jobs in the primary sector was 80, all of which were in agriculture. The number of jobs in the secondary sector was 19 of which 2 or (10.5%) were in manufacturing and 17 (89.5%) were in construction. The number of jobs in the tertiary sector was 21. In the tertiary sector; 10 or 47.6% were in wholesale or retail sales or the repair of motor vehicles, 3 or 14.3% were in a hotel or restaurant and 4 or 19.0% were in education.

In 2000, there were 9 workers who commuted into the municipality and 118 workers who commuted away. The municipality is a net exporter of workers, with about 13.1 workers leaving the municipality for every one entering. Of the working population, 5.8% used public transportation to get to work, and 49.6% used a private car.

== Religion ==
From the 2000 census, 13 or 3.3% were Roman Catholic, while 347 or 87.8% belonged to the Swiss Reformed Church. Of the rest of the population, there were 2 members of an Orthodox church (or about 0.51% of the population), there was 1 individual who belongs to the Christian Catholic Church, and there were 34 individuals (or about 8.61% of the population) who belonged to another Christian church. There were 5 (or about 1.27% of the population) who were Islamic. 5 (or about 1.27% of the population) belonged to no church, are agnostic or atheist, and 5 individuals (or about 1.27% of the population) did not answer the question.

== Education ==
In Treiten about 148 or (37.5%) of the population have completed non-mandatory upper secondary education, and 39 or (9.9%) have completed additional higher education (either university or a Fachhochschule). Of the 39 who completed tertiary schooling, 87.2% were Swiss men, 12.8% were Swiss women.

The Canton of Bern school system provides one year of non-obligatory Kindergarten, followed by six years of Primary school. This is followed by three years of obligatory lower Secondary school where the students are separated according to ability and aptitude. Following the lower Secondary students may attend additional schooling or they may enter an apprenticeship.

During the 2010-11 school year, there were a total of 45 students attending classes in Treiten. There was one kindergarten class with a total of 16 students in the municipality. Of the kindergarten students, 12.5% were permanent or temporary residents of Switzerland (not citizens) and 25.0% have a different mother language than the classroom language. The municipality had 2 primary classes and 29 students. Of the primary students, 6.9% were permanent or temporary residents of Switzerland (not citizens) and 10.3% have a different mother language than the classroom language.

As of 2000, there was one student in Treiten who came from another municipality, while 17 residents attended schools outside the municipality.
