= Finsterhennen =

- Municipality
- Flag Coat of arms
- Location of Finsterhennen
- Location within Switzerland Location within Canton of Bern
- Coordinates: 47°1′N 7°10′E
- Country: Switzerland
- Canton: Bern
- District: Seeland

Area
  - Total: 3.6 km^{2} (1.4 sq mi)
- Elevation: 445 m (1,460 ft)

Population (December 2020)
  - Total: 562
  - Density: 160/km^{2} (400/sq mi)
- Time zone: UTC+01:00 (CET)
  - Summer (DST): UTC+02:00 (CEST)
- Postal code: 2577
- SFOS number: 493
- ISO 3166 code: CH-BE
- Surrounded by: Brüttelen, Kallnach, Lüscherz, Siselen, Treiten
- Website: https://www.finsterhennen.ch SFSO statistics

Finsterhennen is a municipality in the Seeland administrative district in the canton of Bern, Switzerland.

== History ==
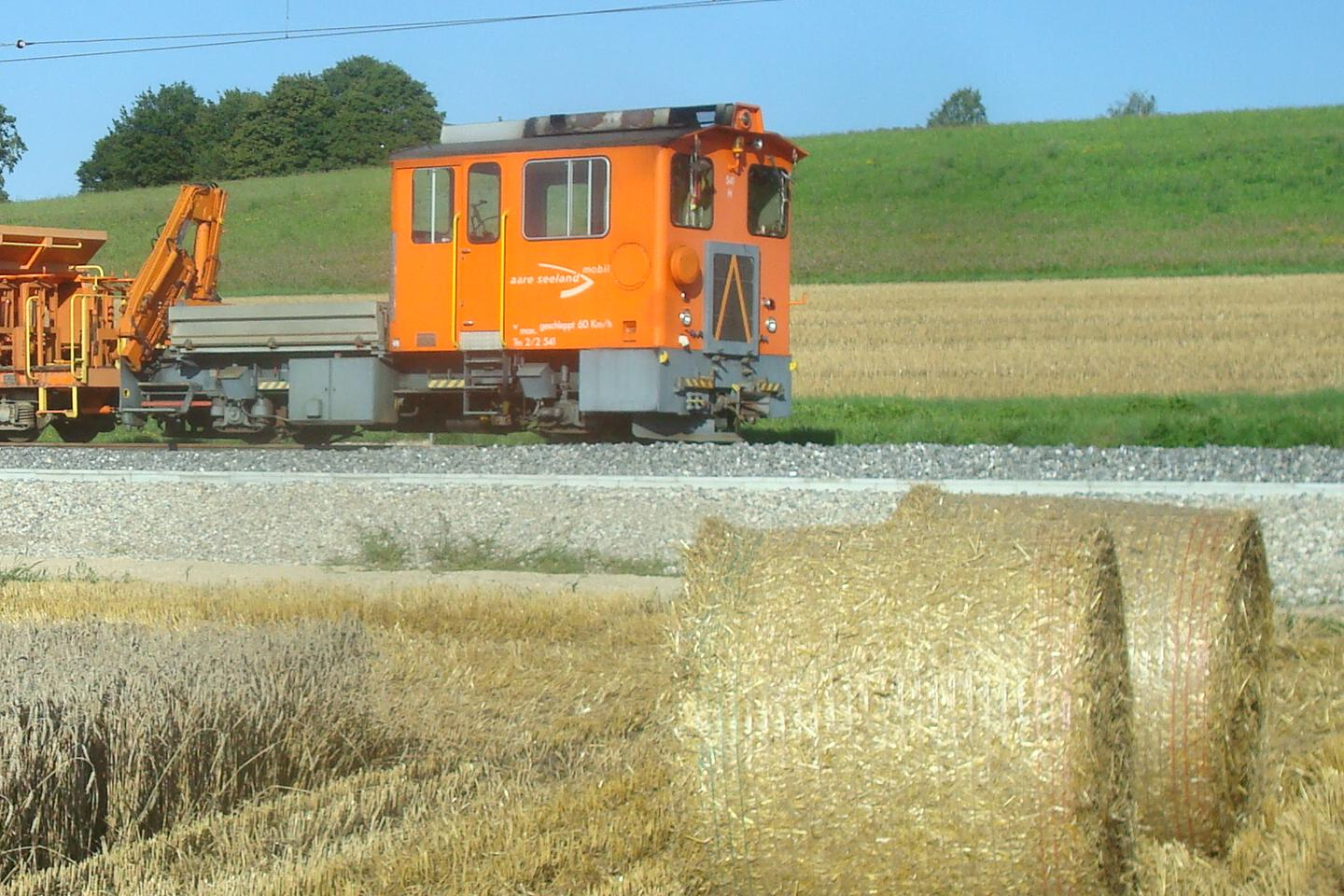
A Tm 2/2 541 rail maintenance unit at Finsterhennen

Finsterhennen is first mentioned around 1220 as Freineshun and in 1453 as Veisten Hennen. In French it was known as Grasse Poule.

The earliest trace of humans in Finsterhennen are some neolithic ceramics which were found at Steinacker-Büne. Other prehistoric traces include prehistoric items at Moos, flints at Usserfeld, tumuli at (Ischlag-Outer Canal), wooden poles for stilt houses at Längäcker, graves in the gravel pit at Pfaffenholz and graves with just bodies by the railroad tracks. From the Roman era, a cache of tools and items were found at Reben and fragments of what appears to be a Roman road at Moos. During the Middle Ages, the village was part of the Herrschaft of Erlach. In 1474 Erlach and the surrounding land was acquired by Bern and became the Bernese bailiwick of Erlach.

The village church was part of the parish of Siselen.

The village lay on the Aarberg-Müntschemier road, which ran along a dry moraine through the Grosses Moos marsh. The Jura water correction project of 1874, drained the marsh and allowed development of the Grosses Moos. In 1916 the Biel-Täuffelen-Ins railroad built a rail station between Siselen and Finsterhennen and a small rail stop in Finsterhennen. This allowed small industry to move into the village. Today the local economy is based on grain, vegetable and dairy farming along with small businesses.

== Geography ==
Finsterhennen has an area of 3.57 km^{2} (1.38 sq mi). Of this area, 2.55 km^{2} (0.98 mi^{2}) or 71.6% is used for agricultural purposes, while 0.57 km^{2} (0.22 mi^{2}) or 16.0% is forested. Of the rest of the land, 0.4 km^{2} (0.15 mi^{2}) or 11.2% is settled (buildings or roads), 0.04 km^{2} (9.9 acres) or 1.1% is either rivers or lakes and 0.01 km^{2} (2.5 acres) or 0.3% is unproductive land.

Of the built up area, industrial buildings made up 1.1% of the total area while housing and buildings made up 4.8% and transportation infrastructure made up 2.5%. Power and water infrastructure as well as other special developed areas made up 2.8% of the area Out of the forested land, 14.9% of the total land area is heavily forested and 1.1% is covered with orchards or small clusters of trees. Of the agricultural land, 66.9% is used for growing crops and 4.5% is pastures. All the water in the municipality is flowing water.

It is located in the Grosses Moos, a particularly productive area with nearly black soil in the Bernese Seeland.

On 31 December 2009 Amtsbezirk Erlach, the municipality's former district, was dissolved. On the following day, 1 January 2010, it joined the newly created Verwaltungskreis Seeland.

== Coat of arms ==
The blazon of the municipal coat of arms is Argent a Hen Sable crested, beaked, unguled and membered Gules and in chief sinister a Mullet of the last. The dark (German: Finster) hen (German: Henne) on the coat of arms makes this an example of canting arms.

== Demographics ==
Finsterhennen has a population (as of December 2020) of 562. As of 2010, 21.7% of the population are resident foreign nationals. Over the last 10 years (2000-2010) the population has changed at a rate of 17.2%. Migration accounted for 16.9%, while births and deaths accounted for 3.6%.

Most of the population (as of 2000) speaks German (376 or 91.5%) as their first language, Portuguese is the second most common (12 or 2.9%) and French is the third (8 or 1.9%). There are 4 people who speak Italian.

As of 2008, the population was 53.8% male and 46.2% female. The population was made up of 203 Swiss men (41.1% of the population) and 63 (12.8%) non-Swiss men. There were 184 Swiss women (37.2%) and 4 (0.8%) non-Swiss women. Of the population in the municipality, 180 or about 43.8% were born in Finsterhennen and lived there in 2000. There were 143 or 34.8% who were born in the same canton, while 39 or 9.5% were born somewhere else in Switzerland, and 45 or 10.9% were born outside of Switzerland.

As of 2010, children and teenagers (0–19 years old) make up 24.3% of the population, while adults (20–64 years old) make up 60.7% and seniors (over 64 years old) make up 15%.

As of 2000, there were 159 people who were single and never married in the municipality. There were 222 married individuals, 19 widows or widowers and 11 individuals who are divorced.

As of 2000, there were 41 households that consist of only one person and 9 households with five or more people. In 2000, a total of 160 apartments (91.4% of the total) were permanently occupied, while 7 apartments (4.0%) were seasonally occupied and 8 apartments (4.6%) were empty.

The historical population is given in the following chart:

== Politics ==
In the 2011 federal election the most popular party was the Swiss People's Party (SVP) which received 38.6% of the vote. The next three most popular parties were the Conservative Democratic Party (BDP) (24.2%), the Social Democratic Party (SP) (14.4%) and the Federal Democratic Union of Switzerland (EDU) (4.3%). In the federal election, a total of 156 votes were cast, and the voter turnout was 50.8%.

== Economy ==
As of 2011, Finsterhennen had an unemployment rate of 1.24%. As of 2008, there were a total of 138 people employed in the municipality. Of these, there were 57 people employed in the primary economic sector and about 17 businesses involved in this sector. 39 people were employed in the secondary sector and there were 5 businesses in this sector. 42 people were employed in the tertiary sector, with 13 businesses in this sector. There were 238 residents of the municipality who were employed in some capacity, of which females made up 40.8% of the workforce.

In 2008 there were a total of 118 full-time equivalent jobs. The number of jobs in the primary sector was 48, all of which were in agriculture. The number of jobs in the secondary sector was 38 of which 31 or (81.6%) were in manufacturing and 7 (18.4%) were in construction. The number of jobs in the tertiary sector was 32. In the tertiary sector; 13 or 40.6% were in wholesale or retail sales or the repair of motor vehicles, 4 or 12.5% were in a hotel or restaurant, 7 or 21.9% were in the information industry, 2 or 6.3% were technical professionals or scientists, 4 or 12.5% were in education.

In 2000, there were 24 workers who commuted into the municipality and 157 workers who commuted away. The municipality is a net exporter of workers, with about 6.5 workers leaving the municipality for every one entering. Of the working population, 12.6% used public transportation to get to work, and 52.1% used a private car.

== Religion ==
From the 2000 census, 46 or 11.2% were Roman Catholic, while 328 or 79.8% belonged to the Swiss Reformed Church. Of the rest of the population, there was 1 individual who belongs to the Christian Catholic Church, and there were 6 individuals (or about 1.46% of the population) who belonged to another Christian church. There were 15 (or about 3.65% of the population) who were Islamic. 13 (or about 3.16% of the population) belonged to no church, are agnostic or atheist, and 5 individuals (or about 1.22% of the population) did not answer the question.

== Education ==
In Finsterhennen about 154 or (37.5%) of the population have completed non-mandatory upper secondary education, and 40 or (9.7%) have completed additional higher education (either university or a Fachhochschule). Of the 40 who completed tertiary schooling, 62.5% were Swiss men, 22.5% were Swiss women.

The Canton of Bern school system provides one year of non-obligatory Kindergarten, followed by six years of Primary school. This is followed by three years of obligatory lower Secondary school where the students are separated according to ability and aptitude. Following the lower Secondary students may attend additional schooling or they may enter an apprenticeship.

During the 2010-11 school year, there were a total of 56 students attending classes in Finsterhennen. There was one kindergarten class with a total of 12 students in the municipality. Of the kindergarten students, 25.0% were permanent or temporary residents of Switzerland (not citizens) and 33.3% have a different mother language than the classroom language. The municipality had 2 primary classes and 44 students. Of the primary students, 13.6% were permanent or temporary residents of Switzerland (not citizens) and 18.2% have a different mother language than the classroom language.

As of 2000, there were 7 students in Finsterhennen who came from another municipality, while 28 residents attended schools outside the municipality.
