= Grand Marais =

Grand Marais may refer to:

- Grand Marais, Louisiana, a Creole unincorporated community in Iberia Parish, Louisiana, United States
- Grand Marais, Manitoba, Canada
- Grand Marais, Michigan, United States
- Grand Marais, Minnesota, United States
- Grand Marais, Seeland, Switzerland
- Grand Marais Creek, a 41.1-mile-long (66.1-kilometer) tributary of the Red River of the North in northwestern Minnesota, United States
- Grand Marais Road (Windsor, Ontario), a road that travels through Windsor, Ontario
- Grand Marais Trail, a small bicycle trail that follows Turkey Creek in the middle of Windsor, Ontario

== See also ==
- Grand (disambiguation)
- Marais (disambiguation)
- Little Marais (disambiguation)
