= Marai =

Marai may refer to

- Marai (name)
- Marai no Tora, a 1943 Japanese film
- Marai Parai, a plateau in Malaysia
- Damhi Marai, a village in Nepal

== See also ==
- Marais (disambiguation)
- Marei (disambiguation)
