= Marais =

Marais (French: [maʁɛ], meaning "marsh") may refer to:

== People ==
- Marais (given name)
- Marais (surname)

== Other uses ==
- Le Marais, historic district of Paris
- Théâtre du Marais, the name of several theatres and theatrical troupes in Paris, France
- Marais (company), a heavy equipment manufacturer based in Durtal, France
- Marais, also known as The Plain, a political group during the French Revolution
- Marais, Louisiana, a fictional town in the 2019 TV series Swamp Thing
- French intensive gardening

== See also ==
- Grand Marais (disambiguation)
- Little Marais (disambiguation)
- Marai (disambiguation)
- Marais des Cygnes (disambiguation)
- Desmarais
