= Little Marais =

Little Marais may refer to:

- Little Marais, Minnesota, an unincorporated community in Lake County, United States
- Little Marais River, a river of Minnesota, United States

== See also ==
- Little (disambiguation)
- Marais (disambiguation)
- Grand Marais (disambiguation)
