= Lüscherz =

- Municipality
- Flag Coat of arms
- Location of Lüscherz
- Location within Switzerland Location within Canton of Bern
- Coordinates: 47°2′N 7°8′E
- Country: Switzerland
- Canton: Bern
- District: Seeland

Area
  - Total: 5.40 km^{2} (2.08 sq mi)
- Elevation: 442 m (1,450 ft)

Population (Dec 2011)
  - Total: 526
  - Density: 97.4/km^{2} (252/sq mi)
- Time zone: UTC+01:00 (CET)
  - Summer (DST): UTC+02:00 (CEST)
- Postal code: 2576
- SFOS number: 497
- ISO 3166 code: CH-BE
- Surrounded by: Brüttelen, Finsterhennen, Hagneck, Ins, Siselen, Twann, Vinelz
- Website: luescherz.ch

Lüscherz is a municipality in the Seeland administrative district in the canton of Bern in Switzerland.

== History ==
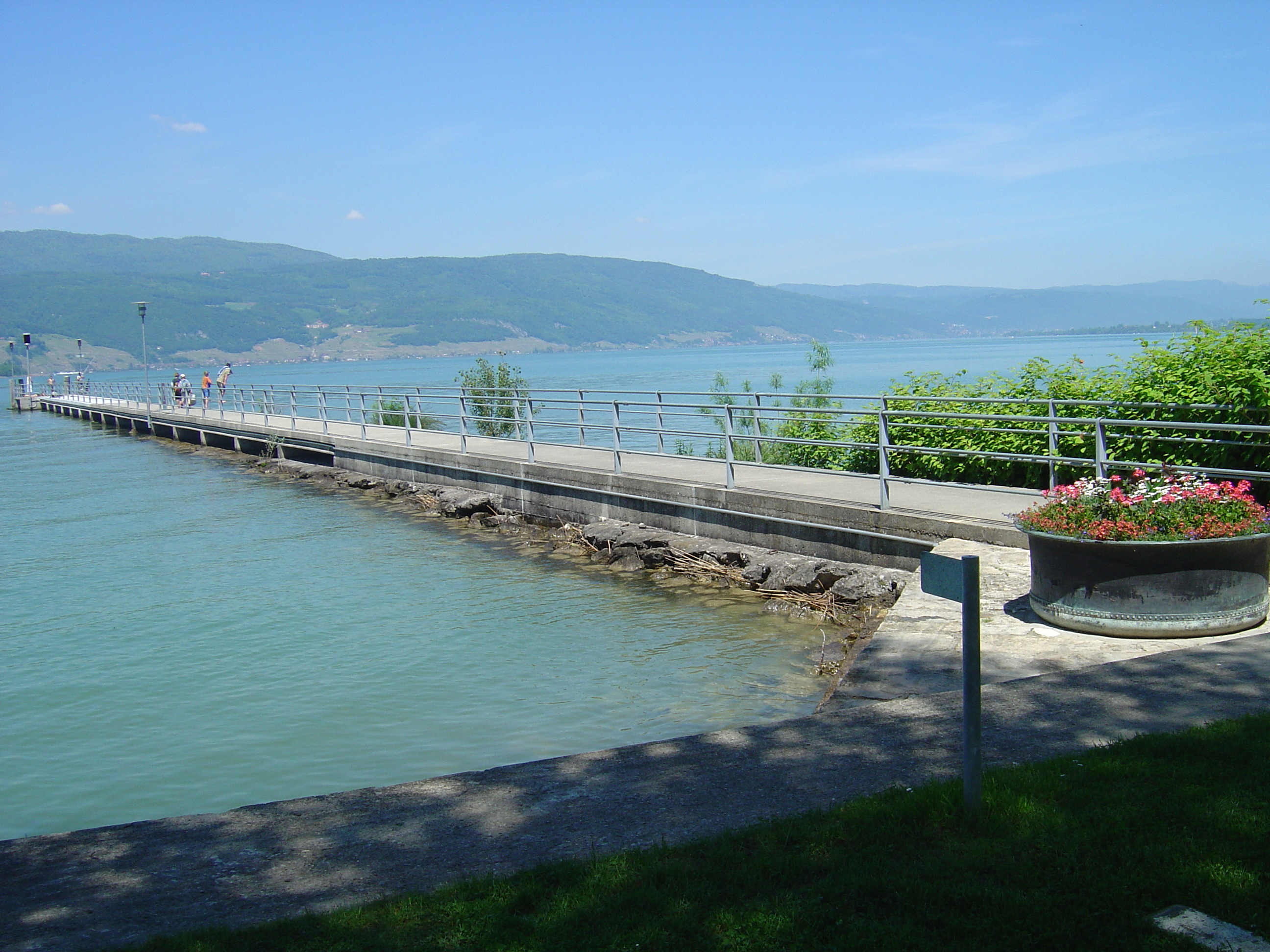
Pier in Lüscherz. The history of the village since the Neolithic has been tied to the lake

Aerial view (1958)

Lüscherz is first mentioned in 1271 as Luschiers, however the area has been settled since at least the Neolithic (ca. 3700 to 2700 BC). The municipality was formerly known by its French name Locras, however, that name is no longer used.

During the Neolithic era there were two villages pile-dwelling (or stilt house) settlements along the shore of Lake Biel. The two settlements are now part of the Prehistoric Pile dwellings around the Alps, a UNESCO World Heritage Site. The later of the two villages was the center of the Neolithic Lüscherz culture. The two sites are partly under water, though the sites near the beach were excavated during the 19th and 20th century and many artifacts ended up in museums. In addition to the two Neolithic sites, a single Bronze Age building was discovered along the shoreline in 2004. At Schaltenrain and Grossholz in the hills above the village several Hallstatt era burial mounds have also been discovered. Finally, a late Paleolithic settlement from around the 12th millennium BC was discovered on a ridge south of the village.

During the Late Middle Ages there was a thriving village at Gurzelen, which was first mentioned in 1335 as Gurtzellon villa and extensive agricultural terraces on the Feiberg. By 1635 Gurzelen only had five occupied houses and in 1730 it was down to three. The terraces were also gradually abandoned. Lüscherz village was part of the Herrschaft of Erlach, and came with the rest of the Herrschaft under Bernese control in 1474.

By 1470 the village began collecting money from pilgrims who came to visit the Chapel of St. Mary under the Seven Oaks. The chapel was abandoned in 1528.

The inhabitants of the village mostly fished for a living, though some farmed or tended vineyards. Beginning in the 1960s, the village became a vacation spot. The port and a beach resort opened in 1957 which attracted tourists. The village grew as weekend and vacation homes were built. While fishing and boat building remained important, tourism became an important source of income. In 2000, almost two-thirds of workers commuted to jobs in nearby cities such as Biel and Bern.

== Geography ==
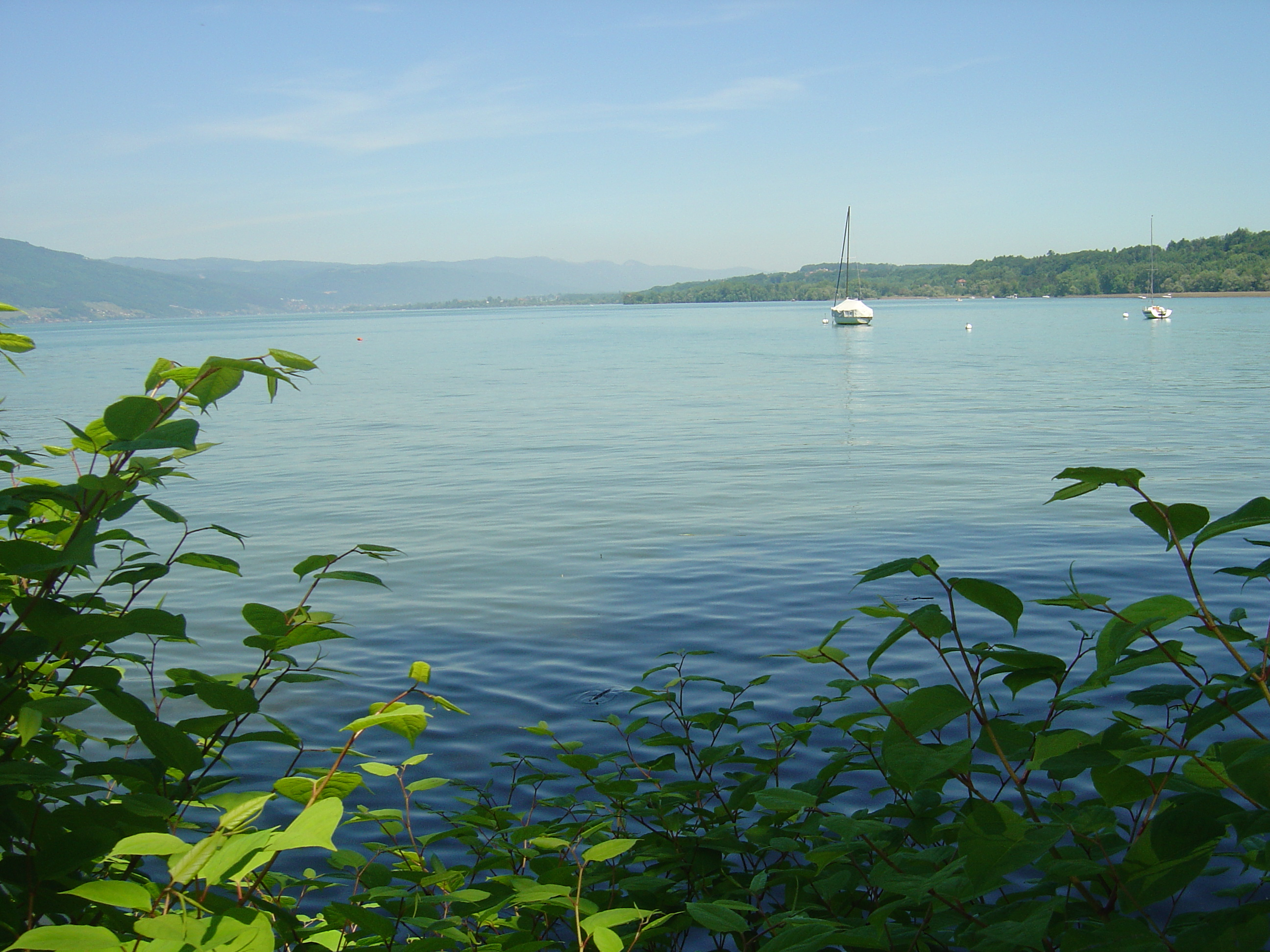
View from Lüscherz over Lake Biel

Lüscherz has an area of 5.42 km^{2} (2.09 sq mi). Of this area, 2.42 km^{2} (0.93 mi^{2}) or 44.3% is used for agricultural purposes, while 2.5 km^{2} (0.97 mi^{2}) or 45.8% is forested. Of the rest of the land, 0.42 km^{2} (0.16 mi^{2}) or 7.7% is settled (buildings or roads), 0.04 km^{2} (9.9 acres) or 0.7% is either rivers or lakes and 0.05 km^{2} (12 acres) or 0.9% is unproductive land.

Of the built up area, housing and buildings made up 4.0% and transportation infrastructure made up 2.9%. Out of the forested land, 44.5% of the total land area is heavily forested and 1.3% is covered with orchards or small clusters of trees. Of the agricultural land, 30.4% is used for growing crops and 7.9% is pastures, while 6.0% is used for orchards or vine crops. Of the water in the municipality, 0.5% is in lakes and 0.2% is in rivers and streams.

On 31 December 2009 Amtsbezirk Erlach, the municipality's former district, was dissolved. On the following day, 1 January 2010, it joined the newly created Verwaltungskreis Seeland.

Lüscherz is located on the right side of Lake Biel and at the foot of Mt. Feiberg. It includes part of the Grosses Moos, a particularly productive area with nearly black soil in the Bernese Seeland, and crosses the Hagneck Canal. It includes the village of Lüscherz and the hamlet of Gurzelen.

== Coat of arms ==
The blazon of the municipal coat of arms is Azure a Ploughshare and in chief a Fish naiant Argent.

== Demographics ==
Lüscherz has a population (as of December 2020) of 559. As of 2010, 9.2% of the population are resident foreign nationals. Over the last 10 years (2000-2010) the population has changed at a rate of 7.9%. Migration accounted for 11.2%, while births and deaths accounted for -2.6%.

Most of the population (as of 2000) speaks German (464 or 94.3%) as their first language, French is the second most common (18 or 3.7%) and English is the third (4 or 0.8%). There is 1 person who speaks Italian.

As of 2008, the population was 52.9% male and 47.1% female. The population was made up of 257 Swiss men (48.4% of the population) and 24 (4.5%) non-Swiss men. There were 225 Swiss women (42.4%) and 2 (0.4%) non-Swiss women. Of the population in the municipality, 175 or about 35.6% were born in Lüscherz and lived there in 2000. There were 186 or 37.8% who were born in the same canton, while 79 or 16.1% were born somewhere else in Switzerland, and 39 or 7.9% were born outside of Switzerland.

As of 2010, children and teenagers (0–19 years old) make up 15.3% of the population, while adults (20–64 years old) make up 68.2% and seniors (over 64 years old) make up 16.6%.

As of 2000, there were 193 people who were single and never married in the municipality. There were 254 married individuals, 25 widows or widowers and 20 individuals who are divorced.

As of 2000, there were 72 households that consist of only one person and 16 households with five or more people. In 2000, a total of 200 apartments (61.3% of the total) were permanently occupied, while 104 apartments (31.9%) were seasonally occupied and 22 apartments (6.7%) were empty. As of 2010, the construction rate of new housing units was 3.8 new units per 1000 residents. The vacancy rate for the municipality, in 2011, was 0.26%.

The historical population is given in the following chart:

== Heritage sites of national significance ==
The Hallstatt era burial mounds at Schaltenrain and Grossholz are listed as a Swiss heritage site of national significance.

== World Heritage Site ==
Lüscherz is home to the Lüscherz-Dorfstation archeological site. Lüscherz-Dorfstation is a prehistoric pile-dwelling (or stilt house) settlement that is part of the Prehistoric Pile dwellings around the Alps UNESCO World Heritage Site.

The lake shore village at Lüscherz-Dorfstation was inhabited twice during the Neolithic era and once during the Bronze Age. It is believed to be the center of the Lüscherz culture, a Neolithic group that existed between 3900 BC and 3700 BC. The Lüscherz culture may have been a predecessor of the Horgen culture, but the exact link is unknown.

The site was discovered in 1863 and consisted of an Inner Site (which was close to the shoreline and the village) and an Outer Site away from the village. Looting of the Inner Site led to a temporary ban on private excavations in 1873. Starting in 1878, a doctor named V. Gross began excavations on the Outer Site, but shortly thereafter both sites were abandoned for almost a century. In 1954 the Historical Museum of Bern began excavating the sites in advance of construction on the waterfront. The construction of a harbor in the late 1950s destroyed part of the village.

The oldest settlement was a Neolithic settlement in the Inner Site that has been somewhat reliably dated to about 3590/3580 BC by tree rings. The second settlement, the Lüscherz culture site, is in the Outer Site. The piles at that site have been dated to be from the period between 2792 and 2709 BC by reliable tree rings.

A scattering of Late Bronze Age items probably came from a village which was farther out in the lake. Very little is known about this village.

== Politics ==
In the 2011 federal election the most popular party was the Swiss People's Party (SVP) which received 46.3% of the vote. The next three most popular parties were the Conservative Democratic Party (BDP) (15.7%), the Social Democratic Party (SP) (11.7%) and the Green Liberal Party (GLP) (9.2%). In the federal election, a total of 174 votes were cast, and the voter turnout was 41.2%.

== Economy ==
As of 2011, Lüscherz had an unemployment rate of 2.04%. As of 2008, there were a total of 129 people employed in the municipality. Of these, there were 48 people employed in the primary economic sector and about 14 businesses involved in this sector. 25 people were employed in the secondary sector and there were 7 businesses in this sector. 56 people were employed in the tertiary sector, with 14 businesses in this sector. There were 266 residents of the municipality who were employed in some capacity, of which females made up 41.7% of the workforce.

In 2008 there were a total of 97 full-time equivalent jobs. The number of jobs in the primary sector was 31, of which 29 were in agriculture and 2 were in fishing or fisheries. The number of jobs in the secondary sector was 22 of which 14 or (63.6%) were in manufacturing and 9 (40.9%) were in construction. The number of jobs in the tertiary sector was 44. In the tertiary sector; 8 or 18.2% were in wholesale or retail sales or the repair of motor vehicles, 2 or 4.5% were in the movement and storage of goods, 27 or 61.4% were in a hotel or restaurant, 1 was in the information industry, 1 was in education and 1 was in health care.

In 2000, there were 40 workers who commuted into the municipality and 183 workers who commuted away. The municipality is a net exporter of workers, with about 4.6 workers leaving the municipality for every one entering. Of the working population, 9.8% used public transportation to get to work, and 61.3% used a private car.

== Religion ==
From the 2000 census, 62 or 12.6% were Roman Catholic, while 369 or 75.0% belonged to the Swiss Reformed Church. Of the rest of the population, there were 12 individuals (or about 2.44% of the population) who belonged to another Christian church. 47 (or about 9.55% of the population) belonged to no church, are agnostic or atheist, and 8 individuals (or about 1.63% of the population) did not answer the question.

== Education ==
In Lüscherz about 203 or (41.3%) of the population have completed non-mandatory upper secondary education, and 63 or (12.8%) have completed additional higher education (either university or a Fachhochschule). Of the 63 who completed tertiary schooling, 65.1% were Swiss men, 27.0% were Swiss women.

The Canton of Bern school system provides one year of non-obligatory Kindergarten, followed by six years of Primary school. This is followed by three years of obligatory lower Secondary school where the students are separated according to ability and aptitude. Following the lower Secondary students may attend additional schooling or they may enter an apprenticeship.

During the 2010–11 school year, there were a total of 49 students attending classes in Lüscherz. There was one kindergarten class with a total of 17 students in the municipality. Of the kindergarten students, 17.6% were permanent or temporary residents of Switzerland (not citizens) and 11.8% have a different mother language than the classroom language. The municipality had 2 primary classes and 32 students. Of the primary students, 3.1% were permanent or temporary residents of Switzerland (not citizens) and 3.1% have a different mother language than the classroom language.

As of 2000, there were 4 students in Lüscherz who came from another municipality, while 37 residents attended schools outside the municipality.
