= Hardheim =

- Municipality
- Coat of arms

- Location of Hardheim within Neckar-Odenwald-Kreis district
- Interactive map of Hardheim
- Location within Germany Location within Baden-Württemberg
- Coordinates: 49°36′38″N 9°28′26″E
- Country: Germany
- State: Baden-Württemberg
- Admin. region: Karlsruhe
- District: Neckar-Odenwald-Kreis
- Subdivisions: 8

Government
  - Mayor (2022–30): Stefan Grimm (FW)

Area
  - Total: 87.02 km^{2} (33.60 sq mi)
- Elevation: 250 m (820 ft)

Population (2025-12-31)
  - Total: 6,650
  - Density: 76.4/km^{2} (198/sq mi)
- Time zone: UTC+01:00 (CET)
  - Summer (DST): UTC+02:00 (CEST)
- Postal codes: 74736
- Dialling codes: 06283
- Vehicle registration: MOS, BCH
- Website: www.hardheim.de

Hardheim is a municipality in the district of Neckar-Odenwald-Kreis, in Baden-Württemberg, Germany. The town is twinned with Müntschemier in Switzerland and Suippes in France. Its existence is first mentioned in written form in 1050. The township consists of Hardheim, Ruedental, Schweinberg, Gerichtstetten, Erfeld, Bretzingen, Dornberg, Ruetschdorf, Vollmersdorf and Breitenau.
