= Seeland (administrative district) =

Seeland District Verwaltungskreis Seeland
- District
- Coordinates: 47°02′N 7°16′E
- Country: Switzerland
- Canton: Bern
- Capital: Aarberg

Area
  - Total: 335 km^{2} (129 sq mi)

Population (2020)
  - Total: 76,052
  - Density: 227/km^{2} (588/sq mi)
- Time zone: UTC+1 (CET)
  - Summer (DST): UTC+2 (CEST)
- Municipalities: 42

Seeland District in the Canton of Bern in Switzerland was created on 1 January 2010. It is part of the Seeland administrative region. It contains 42 municipalities with an area of 334.14 km^{2} (129.01 sq mi) and a population (as of 2020) of 76,052.

== Municipalities ==
Flag	Name	Population (31 December 2020)	Area in km^{2}
Aarberg	Aarberg	4,626	7.92
Arch	Arch	1,700	6.37
Bargen	Bargen	1,051	7.88
Brüttelen	Brüttelen	582	6.62
Büetigen	Büetigen	894	3.62
Bühl	Bühl	482	2.95
Büren an der Aare	Büren an der Aare	3,622	12.64
Diessbach bei Büren	Diessbach bei Büren	991	6.27
Dotzigen	Dotzigen	1,490	4.22
Epsach	Epsach	326	3.44
Erlach	Erlach	1,386	3.50
Finsterhennen	Finsterhennen	562	3.56
Gals	Gals	828	7.84
Gampelen	Gampelen	950	10.75
Grossaffoltern	Grossaffoltern	3,033	15.01
Hagneck	Hagneck	420	1.84
Hermrigen	Hermrigen	307	3.43
Ins	Ins	3,560	23.91
Jens	Jens	633	4.56
Kallnach	Kallnach	2,220	15.19
Kappelen	Kappelen	1,420	10.97
Leuzigen	Leuzigen	1,295	10.27
Lüscherz	Lüscherz	559	5.44
Lyss	Lyss	15,763	1483
Meienried	Meienried	53	0.65
Merzligen	Merzligen	389	2.27
Müntschemier	Müntschemier	1,561	4.88
Oberwil bei Büren	Oberwil bei Büren	887	6.72
Radelfingen	Radelfingen	1,272	14.72
Rapperswil	Rapperswil	2,592	18.19
Rüti bei Büren	Rüti bei Büren	867	6.50
Schüpfen	Schüpfen	3,792	19.83
Seedorf	Seedorf	3,134	20.92
Siselen	Siselen	612	5.50
Studen	Studen (BE)	3,372	2.73
Täuffelen	Täuffelen	2,971	4.40
Treiten	Treiten	429	4.75
Tschugg	Tschugg	470	3.30
Vinelz	Vinelz	878	4.57
Walperswil	Walperswil	1,039	6.94
Wengi	Wengi	630	7.06
Worben	Worben	2,404	2.81
	Total (42)	76,052	334.14

== Mergers and name changes ==
On 1 January 2011 the municipality of Busswil bei Büren merged into the municipality of Lyss.

On 1 January 2013 the municipality of Niederried bei Kallnach merged into Kallnach. The municipality of Ruppoldsried merged into Rapperswil.

On 1 January 2016 the municipality of Bangerten merged into Rapperswil.

On 1 January 2019 the former municipality of Golaten merged into Kallnach.

== History ==
During the Ancien Régime Bern acquired the rural bailiwicks or counties of Aarberg, Buren, Erlach and Nidau from the estates of the Lords of Aarberg-Valangin, Strassberg-Büren, Nidau and the Counts of Neuchâtel. Between 1595 and 1628 they were combined militarily into the so-called Seefähnchen. However, they were politically separate. It was not until 1783-84 that Johann Friedrich von Ryhiner's administrative compendium of the Bernese State presented the four counties as a united region.

During the Helvetic Republic (1798-1803), the borders of the Seeland shrunk to the Amt of Erlach and portions of the Amts of Nidau and Aarberg. Between 1803 and 1815 it was a Grand Council of Bern election district with the Amts of Fraubrunnen and Wangen and portions of the Amts of Bern and Burgdorf. Between 1850 and 1918 it formed a National Council of Switzerland constituency, made up of Laupen and Biel. From 1869 to 1921 it was again a Grand Council of Bern election district made up of the Amts of Biel, Aarberg, Laupen and the northern portion of Bern. In 2010, the Seeland region was created with the Districts of Biel and Seeland. The new Seeland district (Verwaltungskreise) was made up of all or part of the former districts of Aarberg, Büren, Erlach and Nidau

The Bernese Seeland consists of two differing landscapes. The lake shore areas were occupied as far back as the Neolithic, such as the UNESCO World Heritage Site pile dwellings at Twann from about 3800 BC. The lake shore areas were easily settled and fishing dominated the local economies. During the Middle Ages vineyards were added on the slopes of the Jura Mountains above the lakes. In contrast, the plains and the Grosses Moos swamp were crossed by meandering rivers like the Aare and Zihl/Thielle which frequently flooded making the land hostile to settlements. The villages on the edges of the swamp, used the swamp mainly for grazing. However, following the Jura water correction projects the bogs were drained and the formerly useless swamps became excellent farming land.

== Demographics ==
Seeland has a population (as of December 2020) of 76,052.

As of 2008, the population was 49.4% male and 50.6% female. The population was made up of 30,045 Swiss men (44.0% of the population) and 3,719 (5.4%) non-Swiss men. There were 31,406 Swiss women (46.0%) and 311 (0.5%) non-Swiss women.
