= Brüttelen =

- Municipality
- Flag Coat of arms
- Location of Brüttelen
- Location within Switzerland Location within Canton of Bern
- Coordinates: 47°1′N 7°8′E
- Country: Switzerland
- Canton: Bern
- District: Seeland

Area
  - Total: 6.06 km^{2} (2.34 sq mi)
- Elevation: 449 m (1,473 ft)

Population (December 2020)
  - Total: 582
  - Density: 96.0/km^{2} (249/sq mi)
- Time zone: UTC+01:00 (CET)
  - Summer (DST): UTC+02:00 (CEST)
- Postal code: 3237
- SFOS number: 491
- ISO 3166 code: CH-BE
- Surrounded by: Finsterhennen, Ins, Lüscherz, Müntschemier, Treiten, Vinelz
- Website: http://www.bruettelen.ch SFSO statistics

Brüttelen is a municipality in the Seeland administrative district in the canton of Bern in Switzerland.

== History ==
The earliest mention of Brüttelen is in 1142 when it was called Britinie. It also appears in 1148 as Britelgio and in 1183 as Britillo. In French it was known as Bretiège. Gäserz was first mentioned in 1250 as the curtis de Gesarz.

Archeologists have discovered scattered graves dating from the La Tène era up to the High Middle Ages in Brüttelen. Additionally, neolithic axe heads, Hallstatt grave mounds and Roman era brick have also been found. It is believed that there was a medieval settlement on the Schaltenrain, though little archeological evidence has been discovered. The Lords of Brüttelen appear in the records of the 12th and 13th century. Despite several fires between the 17th and 19th centuries, many of the old houses and buildings remain.

The village chapel was mentioned in 1142 as a filial chapel of Payerne Priory.

A gristmill was first mentioned in the village in 1255. The village remained completely agricultural until a quarry opened in the 17th century and in 1737 a health spa or mineral bath opened. The spa closed in 1886, but the building was used for a variety of purposes. In 1898 it became a girls boarding school. In 1982 it was converted into a home for the handicapped. In 1917 the electric narrow gauge Biel-Ins railway connected the village with the rest of the country. However, the village has remained generally agricultural. In 1990, almost half of the working population worked in agriculture.

== Geography ==
Brüttelen has an area of 6.61 km^{2} (2.55 sq mi). Of this area, 4.62 km^{2} (1.78 mi^{2}) or 69.8% is used for agricultural purposes, while 1.48 km^{2} (0.57 mi^{2}) or 22.4% is forested. Of the rest of the land, 0.47 km^{2} (0.18 mi^{2}) or 7.1% is settled (buildings or roads), 0.04 km^{2} (9.9 acres) or 0.6% is either rivers or lakes.

Of the built up area, housing and buildings made up 3.9% and transportation infrastructure made up 2.9%. Out of the forested land, all of the forested land area is covered with heavy forests. Of the agricultural land, 58.9% is used for growing crops and 9.8% is pastures, while 1.1% is used for orchards or vine crops. All the water in the municipality is flowing water.

Brüttelen is located on the northern shore of the Moossee in the Grosses Moos and at the foot of the Schaltenrain (592 m (1,942 ft)). It includes the village of Brüttelen, several scattered individual farm houses and since 1917 the former village of Gäserz.

On 31 December 2009 Amtsbezirk Erlach, the municipality's former district, was dissolved. On the following day, 1 January 2010, it joined the newly created Verwaltungskreis Seeland.

== Coat of arms ==
The blazon of the municipal coat of arms is Gules on a Pale Or three Chevrons Sable and overall a Bend wavy Azure.

== Demographics ==
Brüttelen has a population (as of December 2020) of 582. As of 2010, 13.3% of the population are resident foreign nationals. Over the last 10 years (2000–2010) the population has changed at a rate of -3.2%. Migration accounted for 1.9%, while births and deaths accounted for -4.7%.

Most of the population (as of 2000) speaks German (589 or 91.6%) as their first language, French is the second most common (26 or 4.0%) and Portuguese is the third (11 or 1.7%). There are 2 people who speak Italian.

As of 2008, the population was 52.5% male and 47.5% female. The population was made up of 255 Swiss men (44.5% of the population) and 46 (8.0%) non-Swiss men. There were 242 Swiss women (42.2%) and 3 (0.5%) non-Swiss women. Of the population in the municipality, 233 or about 36.2% were born in Brüttelen and lived there in 2000. There were 250 or 38.9% who were born in the same canton, while 82 or 12.8% were born somewhere else in Switzerland, and 51 or 7.9% were born outside of Switzerland.

As of 2010, children and teenagers (0–19 years old) make up 19.9% of the population, while adults (20–64 years old) make up 63.4% and seniors (over 64 years old) make up 16.8%.

As of 2000, there were 276 people who were single and never married in the municipality. There were 308 married individuals, 32 widows or widowers and 27 individuals who are divorced.

As of 2000, there were 55 households that consist of only one person and 14 households with five or more people. In 2000, a total of 238 apartments (88.5% of the total) were permanently occupied, while 16 apartments (5.9%) were seasonally occupied and 15 apartments (5.6%) were empty. The vacancy rate for the municipality, in 2011, was 1.02%.

The historical population is given in the following chart:

== Sights ==
The entire hamlet of Gäserz is designated as part of the Inventory of Swiss Heritage Sites.

== Politics ==
In the 2011 federal election the most popular party was the Swiss People's Party (SVP) which received 42.6% of the vote. The next three most popular parties were the Conservative Democratic Party (BDP) (22.8%), the Social Democratic Party (SP) (14.4%) and the Green Party (6.3%). In the federal election, a total of 194 votes were cast, and the voter turnout was 45.6%.

== Economy ==
As of 2011, Brüttelen had an unemployment rate of 1.08%. As of 2008, there were a total of 225 people employed in the municipality. Of these, there were 105 people employed in the primary economic sector and about 25 businesses involved in this sector. 17 people were employed in the secondary sector and there were 7 businesses in this sector. 103 people were employed in the tertiary sector, with 11 businesses in this sector. There were 335 residents of the municipality who were employed in some capacity, of which females made up 42.7% of the workforce.

In 2008 there were a total of 174 full-time equivalent jobs. The number of jobs in the primary sector was 88, of which 64 were in agriculture and 24 were in forestry or lumber production. The number of jobs in the secondary sector was 15 of which 4 or (26.7%) were in manufacturing and 11 (73.3%) were in construction. The number of jobs in the tertiary sector was 71. In the tertiary sector; 5 or 7.0% were in wholesale or retail sales or the repair of motor vehicles, 3 or 4.2% were in a hotel or restaurant, 5 or 7.0% were in education and 52 or 73.2% were in health care.

In 2000, there were 110 workers who commuted into the municipality and 212 workers who commuted away. The municipality is a net exporter of workers, with about 1.9 workers leaving the municipality for every one entering. Of the working population, 16.4% used public transportation to get to work, and 49.3% used a private car.

== Religion ==
From the 2000 census, 56 or 8.7% were Roman Catholic, while 511 or 79.5% belonged to the Swiss Reformed Church. Of the rest of the population, there were 2 members of an Orthodox church (or about 0.31% of the population), and there were 12 individuals (or about 1.87% of the population) who belonged to another Christian church. There were 11 (or about 1.71% of the population) who were Islamic. There were 3 individuals who were Buddhist and 2 individuals who were Hindu. 41 (or about 6.38% of the population) belonged to no church, are agnostic or atheist, and 11 individuals (or about 1.71% of the population) did not answer the question.

== Education ==
In Brüttelen about 216 or (33.6%) of the population have completed non-mandatory upper secondary education, and 60 or (9.3%) have completed additional higher education (either university or a Fachhochschule). Of the 60 who completed tertiary schooling, 70.0% were Swiss men, 25.0% were Swiss women.

The Canton of Bern school system provides one year of non-obligatory Kindergarten, followed by six years of Primary school. This is followed by three years of obligatory lower Secondary school where the students are separated according to ability and aptitude. Following the lower Secondary students may attend additional schooling or they may enter an apprenticeship.

During the 2010-11 school year, there were a total of 26 students attending classes in Brüttelen. There were no kindergarten classes in the municipality. The municipality had 2 primary classes and 26 students. Of the primary students, 15.4% were permanent or temporary residents of Switzerland (not citizens) and 23.1% have a different mother language than the classroom language.

As of 2000, there were 7 students in Brüttelen who came from another municipality, while 44 residents attended schools outside the municipality.
