= Vinelz =

- Municipality
- Flag Coat of arms
- Location of Vinelz
- Location within Switzerland Location within Canton of Bern
- Coordinates: 47°2′N 7°6′E
- Country: Switzerland
- Canton: Bern
- District: Seeland

Area
  - Total: 4.6 km^{2} (1.8 sq mi)
- Elevation: 460 m (1,510 ft)

Population (December 2020)
  - Total: 878
  - Density: 190/km^{2} (490/sq mi)
- Time zone: UTC+01:00 (CET)
  - Summer (DST): UTC+02:00 (CEST)
- Postal code: 3234
- SFOS number: 502
- ISO 3166 code: CH-BE
- Surrounded by: Brüttelen, Erlach, Ins, Lüscherz, Twann
- Website: www.vinelz.ch

Vinelz is a municipality in the Seeland administrative district in the canton of Bern in Switzerland.

== History ==
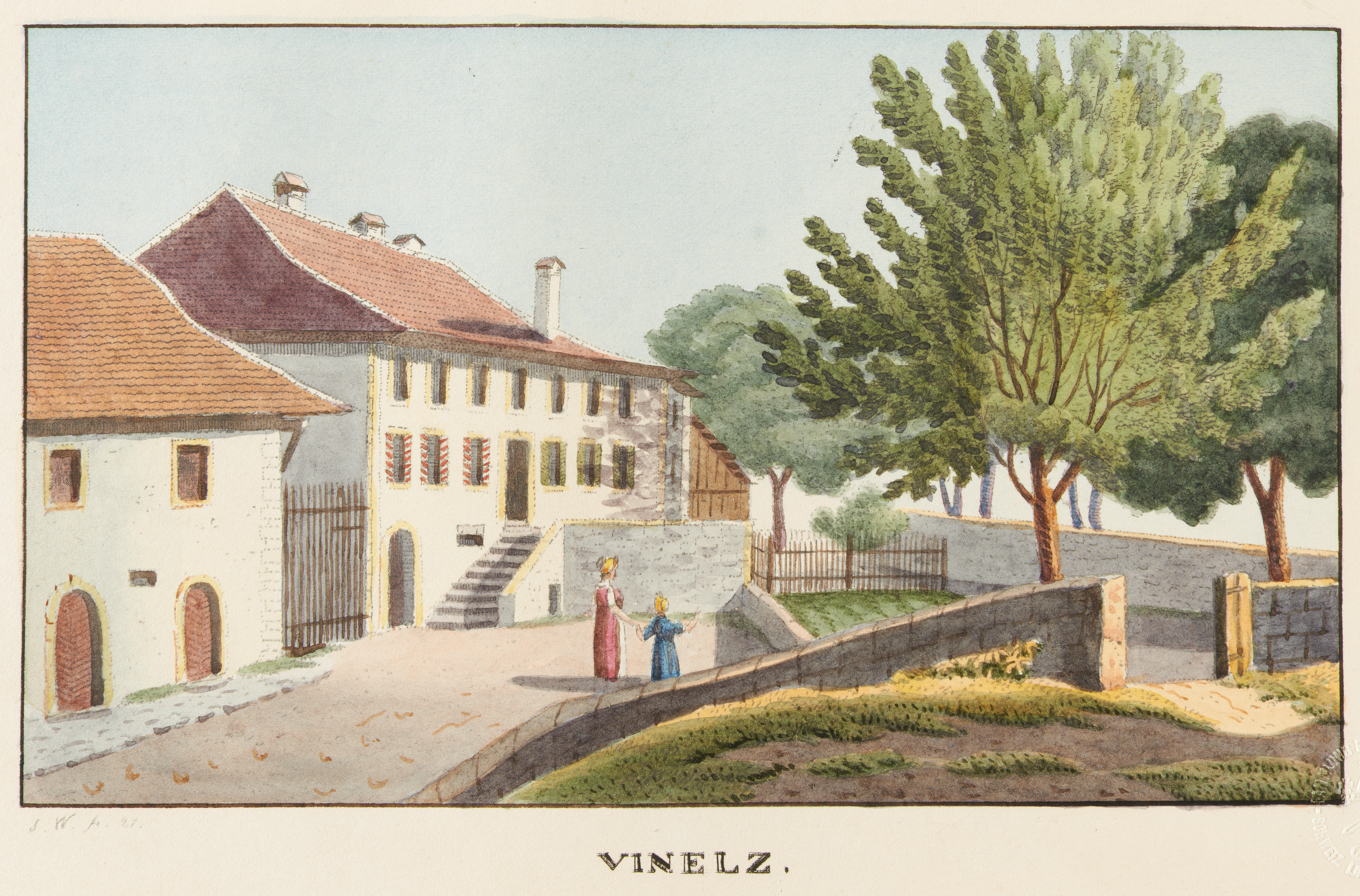
Clergy house in Vinelz, before 1850, by Jakob Samuel Weibel

Aerial view, 1958

Vinelz is first mentioned in 1228 as Fenis. The municipality was formerly known by its French name Fenil, however, that name is no longer used.

There were extensive Neolithic and Bronze Age settlements along the shore of Lake Biel, which stretch into Lüscherz. Inland an Early Bronze Age settlement has been discovered at Schattewil, while Roman settlements were found at Mieschzälg and Flachseren. During the Middle Ages it was part of the Herrschaft of Erlach. In 1474 all the Erlach lands, including Vinelz, were acquired by Bern. Under Bernese rule it became part of the new bailiwick of Erlach. In 1691, Emanuel Gaudard, a citizen of Bern, built the Landsitz (country manor house) Obere Budlei in the village.

The village church of St. Mary's was first mentioned in 1228. It was probably founded by the Counts of Fenis, who ruled from the nearby Fenis or Hasenburg Castle. The church was decorated with murals during the 14th century and rebuilt in 1484. Following the Protestant Reformation in 1528, the patronage rights over the church transferred to Bern. The Vinelz parish includes the nearby municipality of Lüscherz.

In the 1960s new vacation and weekend homes changed the agricultural character of village. Restaurants, three campgrounds and a marina have changed Vinelz into a tourist center on Lake Biel.

== Geography ==
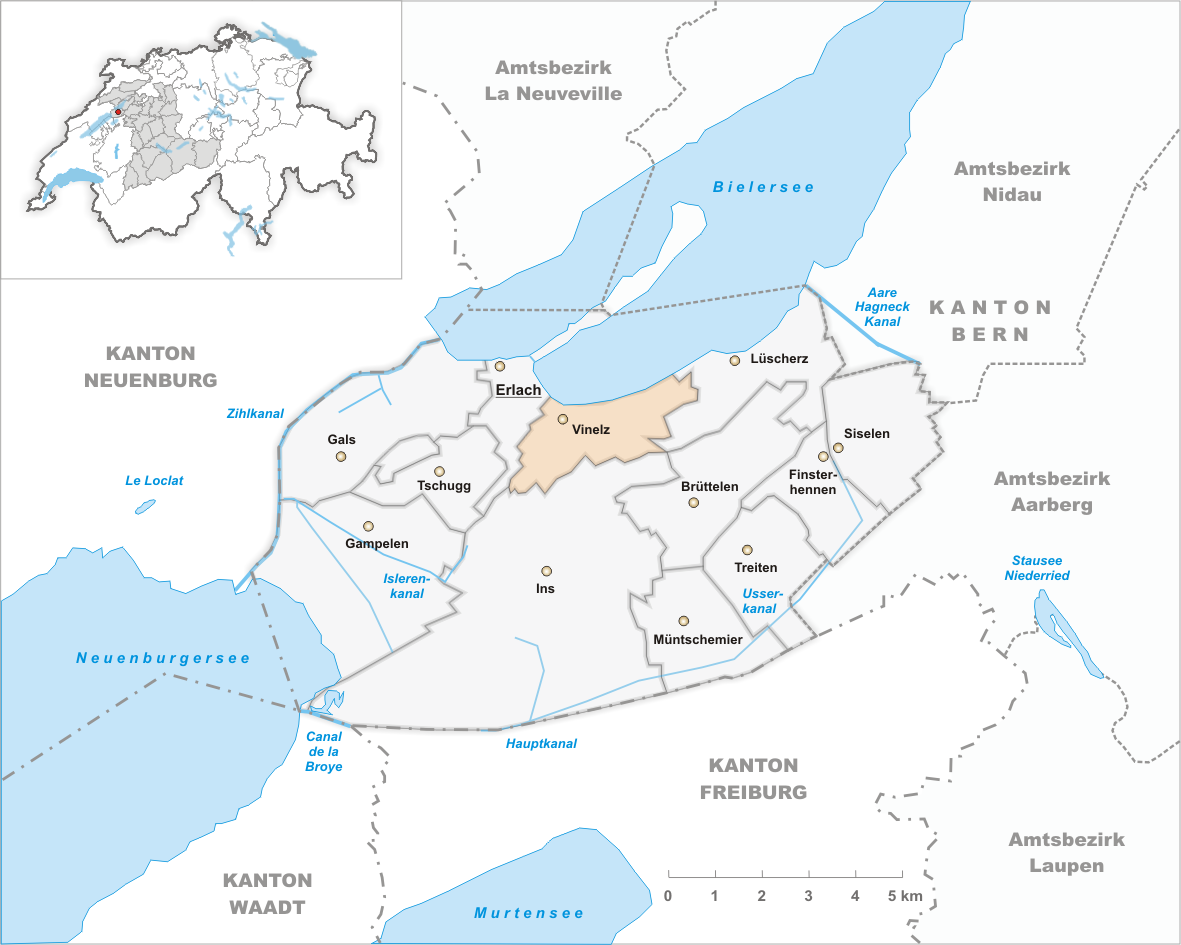
Municipality of Vinelz

Vinelz has an area of 4.56 km^{2} (1.76 sq mi). Of this area, 2.36 km^{2} (0.91 mi^{2}) or 51.6% is used for agricultural purposes, while 1.62 km^{2} (0.63 mi^{2}) or 35.4% is forested. Of the rest of the land, 0.64 km^{2} (0.25 mi^{2}) or 14.0% is settled (buildings or roads) and 0.01 km^{2} (2.5 acres) or 0.2% is unproductive land.

Of the built up area, housing and buildings made up 9.0% and transportation infrastructure made up 2.8%. while parks, green belts and sports fields made up 1.5%. Out of the forested land, 34.1% of the total land area is heavily forested and 1.3% is covered with orchards or small clusters of trees. Of the agricultural land, 39.8% is used for growing crops and 6.8% is pastures, while 5.0% is used for orchards or vine crops.

The municipality is located on the right, upper end of Lake Biel and stretches to the foot of Schaltenrain mountain. It consists of the village of Vinelz and the farm houses of Budlei.

On 31 December 2009 Amtsbezirk Erlach, the municipality's former district, was dissolved. On the following day, 1 January 2010, it joined the newly created Verwaltungskreis Seeland.

== Coat of arms ==
The blazon of the municipal coat of arms is Azure a Sickle Argent bladed to sinister handled Or and a Ploughshare inverted of the second.

== Demographics ==
Vinelz has a population (as of December 2020) of 878. As of 2010, 8.8% of the population are resident foreign nationals. Over the last 10 years (2000-2010) the population has changed at a rate of 10.9%. Migration accounted for 10.9%, while births and deaths accounted for 0.3%.

Most of the population (as of 2000) speaks German (677 or 92.1%) as their first language, French is the second most common (39 or 5.3%) and Albanian is the third (6 or 0.8%).

As of 2008, the population was 49.0% male and 51.0% female. The population was made up of 353 Swiss men (43.4% of the population) and 46 (5.7%) non-Swiss men. There were 389 Swiss women (47.8%) and 26 (3.2%) non-Swiss women. Of the population in the municipality, 208 or about 28.3% were born in Vinelz and lived there in 2000. There were 305 or 41.5% who were born in the same canton, while 142 or 19.3% were born somewhere else in Switzerland, and 68 or 9.3% were born outside of Switzerland.

As of 2010, children and teenagers (0–19 years old) make up 20.6% of the population, while adults (20–64 years old) make up 57.5% and seniors (over 64 years old) make up 21.9%.

As of 2000, there were 267 people who were single and never married in the municipality. There were 394 married individuals, 37 widows or widowers and 37 individuals who are divorced.

As of 2000, there were 89 households that consist of only one person and 21 households with five or more people. In 2000, a total of 304 apartments (76.2% of the total) were permanently occupied, while 81 apartments (20.3%) were seasonally occupied and 14 apartments (3.5%) were empty. As of 2010, the construction rate of new housing units was 1.2 new units per 1000 residents. The vacancy rate for the municipality, in 2011, was 1.83%.

The historical population is given in the following chart:

== World heritage site ==
It is home to the Strandboden prehistoric pile-dwelling (or stilt house) settlement that is part of the Prehistoric Pile dwellings around the Alps UNESCO World Heritage Site.

The Standboden site was extensively occupied during the Neolithic period. Tree ring analysis has found settlements from 3160 BC, 2850 BC, 2820 BC, 2750-2690 BC and 2660-2620 BC. Strandboden and the nearby Ländti site were discovered and first excavated by E. von Fellenberg and V. Gross in 1881/82. The site was also explored in 1937, 1960, 1980, 1985/86 and 2005. One of the most interesting discoveries was a disc wheel from 2750 BC.

== Heritage sites of national significance ==
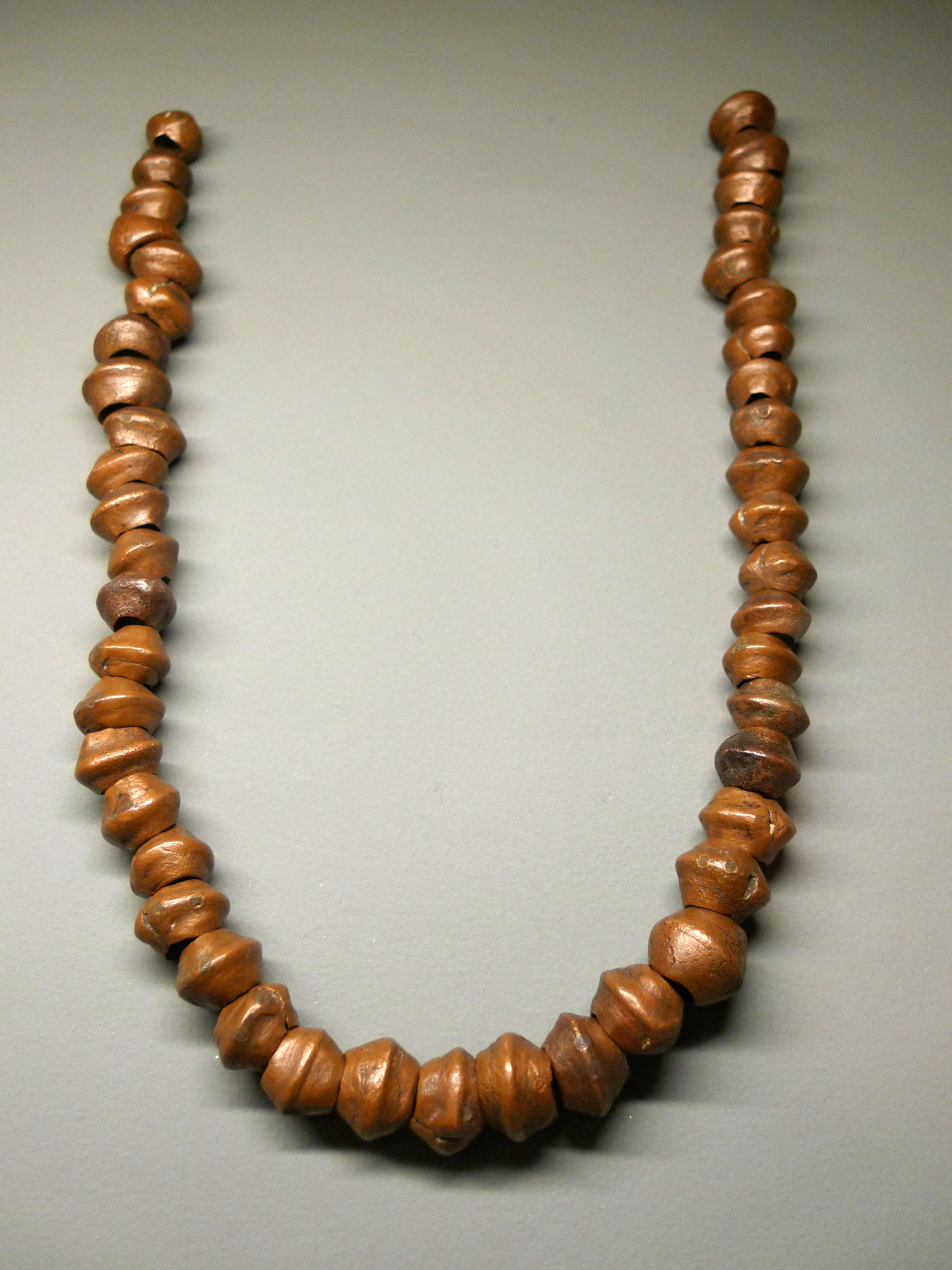
Bronze necklace from the Neolithic settlement of Vinelz on Lake Biel, Switzerland, c. 2700 BC.

The Ländti, a Neolithic and Bronze Age lakeshore settlement is listed as a Swiss heritage site of national significance. The entire village of Vinelz is part of the Inventory of Swiss Heritage Sites.

== Politics ==
In the 2011 federal election the most popular party was the Swiss People's Party (SVP) which received 28.9% of the vote. The next three most popular parties were the Conservative Democratic Party (BDP) (25.4%), the Social Democratic Party (SP) (14.5%) and the Green Party (8.8%). In the federal election, a total of 336 votes were cast, and the voter turnout was 53.9%.

== Economy ==
As of 2011, Vinelz had an unemployment rate of 1.46%. As of 2008, there were a total of 140 people employed in the municipality. Of these, there were 40 people employed in the primary economic sector and about 14 businesses involved in this sector. 42 people were employed in the secondary sector and there were 8 businesses in this sector. 58 people were employed in the tertiary sector, with 23 businesses in this sector. There were 407 residents of the municipality who were employed in some capacity, of which females made up 45.7% of the workforce.

In 2008 there were a total of 107 full-time equivalent jobs. The number of jobs in the primary sector was 29, all of which were in agriculture. The number of jobs in the secondary sector was 39 of which 3 or (7.7%) were in manufacturing and 37 (94.9%) were in construction. The number of jobs in the tertiary sector was 39. In the tertiary sector; 8 or 20.5% were in wholesale or retail sales or the repair of motor vehicles, 2 or 5.1% were in the movement and storage of goods, 7 or 17.9% were in a hotel or restaurant, 1 was in the information industry, 7 or 17.9% were technical professionals or scientists, 4 or 10.3% were in education.

In 2000, there were 65 workers who commuted into the municipality and 288 workers who commuted away. The municipality is a net exporter of workers, with about 4.4 workers leaving the municipality for every one entering. Of the working population, 10.3% used public transportation to get to work, and 61.4% used a private car.

== Religion ==
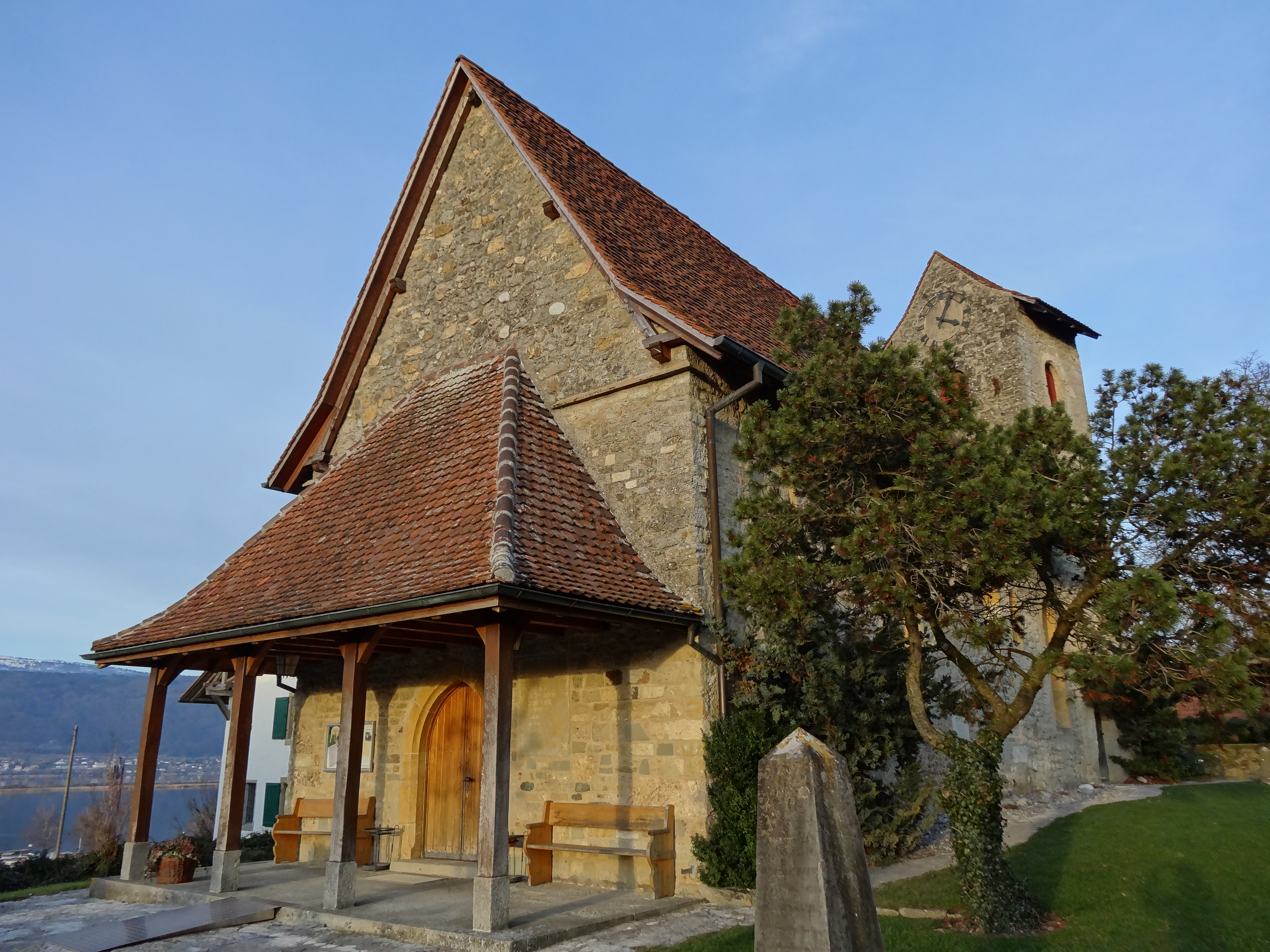
Vinelz reformed church with vicarage

From the 2000 census, 88 or 12.0% were Roman Catholic, while 578 or 78.6% belonged to the Swiss Reformed Church. Of the rest of the population, there were 13 individuals (or about 1.77% of the population) who belonged to another Christian church. There were 7 (or about 0.95% of the population) who were Islamic. 49 (or about 6.67% of the population) belonged to no church, are agnostic or atheist, and 6 individuals (or about 0.82% of the population) did not answer the question.

== Education ==
In Vinelz about 318 or (43.3%) of the population have completed non-mandatory upper secondary education, and 121 or (16.5%) have completed additional higher education (either university or a Fachhochschule). Of the 121 who completed tertiary schooling, 66.9% were Swiss men, 25.6% were Swiss women, 4.1% were non-Swiss men.

The Canton of Bern school system provides one year of non-obligatory Kindergarten, followed by six years of Primary school. This is followed by three years of obligatory lower Secondary school where the students are separated according to ability and aptitude. Following the lower Secondary students may attend additional schooling or they may enter an apprenticeship.

During the 2010-11 school year, there were a total of 64 students attending classes in Vinelz. There were no kindergarten classes in the municipality. The municipality had 3 primary classes and 64 students. Of the primary students, 4.7% were permanent or temporary residents of Switzerland (not citizens) and 9.4% have a different mother language than the classroom language.

As of 2000, there were 18 students in Vinelz who came from another municipality, while 50 residents attended schools outside the municipality.
