= Marei (name) =

Marei (Arabic: مرعي) is an Arabic name. Notable people with the name include:

== Given name ==
- Marei Al-Moqaadi (born 1988), Saudi football striker
- Marei Al Ramly (born 1977), Libyan football midfielder

== Surname ==
- Ahmed Marei (born 1959), Egyptian basketball coach and former player
- Ahmed Marei (Jordanian footballer) (born 1987), Jordanian football forward
- Assem Marei (born 1992), Egyptian basketball player, son of Ahmed
- Bara' Marei (born 1994), Jordanian footballer
- Essam Marei, Egyptian footballer
- Mamdouh Marei (1938–2018), Egyptian jurist and politician
- Sayed Marei (1913–1993), Egyptian engineer and politician
