= Müntschemier =

- Municipality
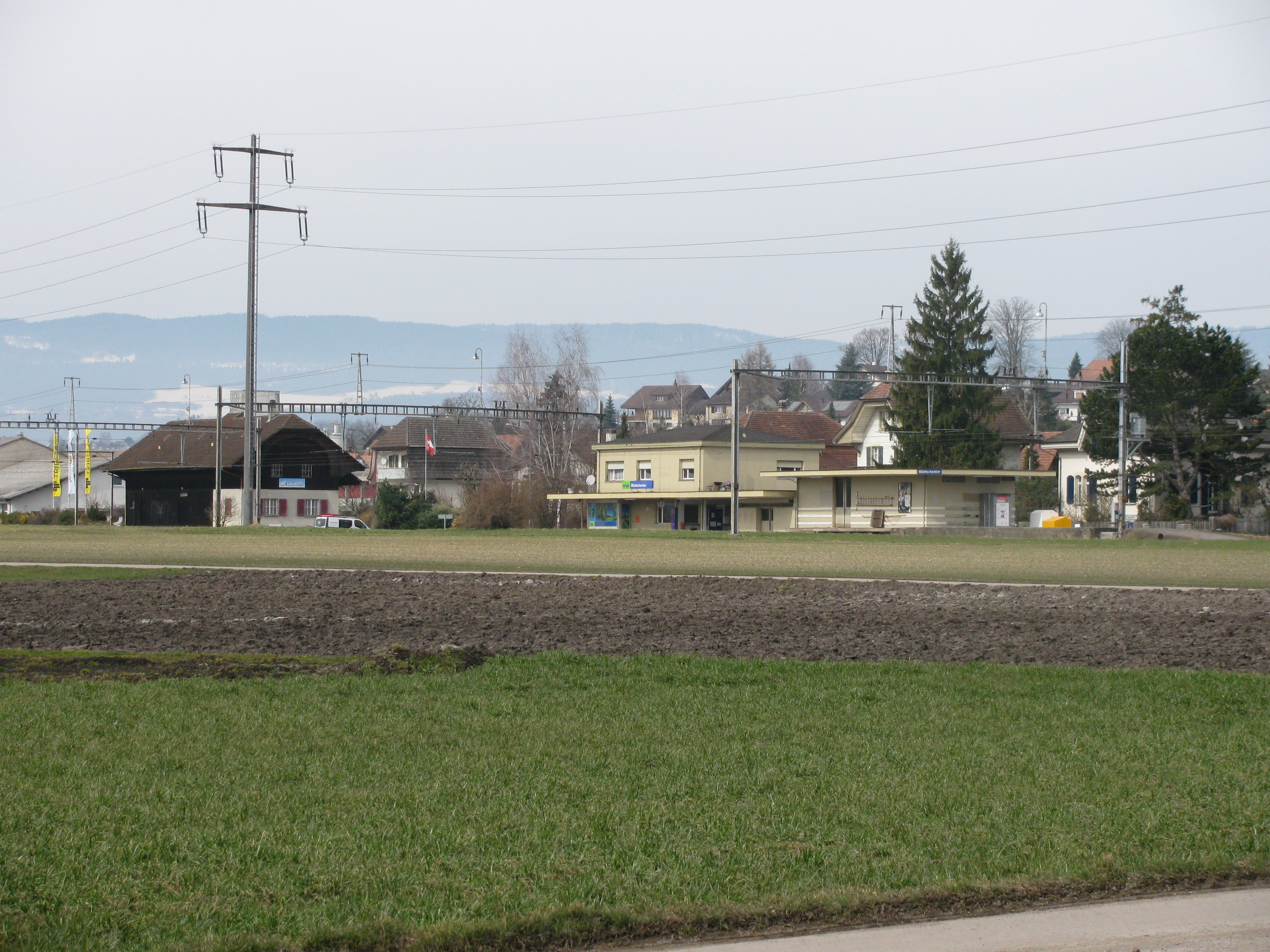
- Müntschemier village station

- Flag Coat of arms
- Location of Müntschemier
- Location within Switzerland Location within Canton of Bern
- Coordinates: 46°59′N 7°8′E
- Country: Switzerland
- Canton: Bern
- District: Seeland

Government
  - Mayor: Jakob Jampen

Area
  - Total: 4.9 km^{2} (1.9 sq mi)
- Elevation: 438 m (1,437 ft)

Population (December 2020)
  - Total: 1,561
  - Density: 320/km^{2} (830/sq mi)
- Time zone: UTC+01:00 (CET)
  - Summer (DST): UTC+02:00 (CEST)
- Postal code: 3225
- SFOS number: 498
- ISO 3166 code: CH-BE
- Surrounded by: Brüttelen, Treiten, Kerzers, Ried bei Kerzers, Murten, Bas-Vully, Ins
- Twin towns: Hardheim (Germany)
- Website: https://www.muentschemier.ch/

Müntschemier (French: Monsmier) is a municipality in the Seeland administrative district in the canton of Bern in Switzerland.

== History ==
Aerial view (1954)

Müntschemier is first mentioned in 1185 as Munchimur.

The earliest traces of a settlement in the area are some Mesolithic flint tools which were found at Baholz-Oberfeld. Other prehistoric traces include a Bronze Age grave or ruins of a settlement at Müntschemier marsh and a Roman era burial site at Gugleracker. In 1185 the Abbey of St. Johannsen began ruling over the village. In 1474 the entire Herrschaft of Erlach, including Müntschemier, was acquired by Bern. It became part of the Bernese court of Ins in the bailiwick of Erlach. In addition to belonging to the court, Müntschemier has always been part of the parish of Ins. In 1827, part of the village was destroyed in a fire. It was rebuilt in the following years. The cost of the 1874-83 Jura water correction project forced the Bürgergemeinde to sell the common fields or Allmend. In 1876, the Bürgergemeinde no longer had a purpose and was dissolved. The Jura water correction helped drain the Grand Marais marsh and allowed the village to spread into the rich farmland left behind. In 1858-63 a major highway through le Grand Marais connected the village with the rest of the country. In 1902 the Bern–Neuchâtel railway provided another route into the village. The easy transportation links led to population growth. In 1956 a freight yard and warehouses turned Müntschemier into a center for vegetable production and shipping in Switzerland.

== Geography ==
Müntschemier has an area of 4.87 km^{2} (1.88 sq mi). Of this area, 3.8 km^{2} (1.5 mi^{2}) or 77.9% is used for agricultural purposes, while 0.09 km^{2} (0.035 mi^{2}) or 1.8% is forested. Of the rest of the land, 0.91 km^{2} (0.35 mi^{2}) or 18.6% is settled (buildings or roads), 0.03 km^{2} (7.4 acres) or 0.6% is either rivers or lakes and 0.05 km^{2} (12 acres) or 1.0% is unproductive land.

Of the built up area, industrial buildings made up 3.3% of the total area while housing and buildings made up 5.7% and transportation infrastructure made up 7.4%. Power and water infrastructure as well as other special developed areas made up 1.2% of the area. Out of the forested land, 0.6% of the total land area is heavily forested and 1.2% is covered with orchards or small clusters of trees. Of the agricultural land, 70.9% is used for growing crops and 4.5% is pastures, while 2.5% is used for orchards or vine crops. Of the water in the municipality, 0.2% is in lakes and 0.4% is in rivers and streams.

Müntschemier lies in the Grand Marais, a particularly productive area with nearly black soil in the Bernese Seeland.

Müntschemier lies on the railroad line between Neuchâtel and Bern. The S5 stops there.

On 31 December 2009 Amtsbezirk Erlach, the municipality's former district, was dissolved. On the following day, 1 January 2010, it joined the newly created Verwaltungskreis Seeland.

== Coat of arms ==
The blazon of the municipal coat of arms is Per Pale Or and Argent overall a Mount of 3 Coupeaux Gules and in dexter issuant an Alder Tree Vert trunked Argent and in sinister issuant an Ear Or.

== Demographics ==
Müntschemier has a population (as of December 2020) of 1,561. As of 2010, 27.0% of the population are resident foreign nationals. Over the last 10 years (2000-2010) the population has changed at a rate of 17.7%. Migration accounted for 13.6%, while births and deaths accounted for 3.8%.

Most of the population (as of 2000) speaks German (904 or 81.7%) as their first language, Portuguese is the second most common (106 or 9.6%) and French is the third (37 or 3.3%). There are 11 people who speak Italian.

As of 2008, the population was 51.1% male and 48.9% female. The population was made up of 468 Swiss men (36.3% of the population) and 190 (14.8%) non-Swiss men. There were 472 Swiss women (36.6%) and 15 (1.2%) non-Swiss women. Of the population in the municipality, 461 or about 41.6% were born in Müntschemier and lived there in 2000. There were 278 or 25.1% who were born in the same canton, while 166 or 15.0% were born somewhere else in Switzerland, and 196 or 17.7% were born outside of Switzerland.

As of 2010, children and teenagers (0–19 years old) make up 21.6% of the population, while adults (20–64 years old) make up 64.5% and seniors (over 64 years old) make up 13.9%.

As of 2000, there were 442 people who were single and never married in the municipality. There were 568 married individuals, 59 widows or widowers and 38 individuals who are divorced.

As of 2000, there were 121 households that consist of only one person and 26 households with five or more people. In 2000, a total of 438 apartments (89.6% of the total) were permanently occupied, while 22 apartments (4.5%) were seasonally occupied and 29 apartments (5.9%) were empty. As of 2010, the construction rate of new housing units was 3.9 new units per 1000 residents. The vacancy rate for the municipality, in 2011, was 0.51%.

The historical population is given in the following chart:

== Politics ==
In the 2011 federal election the most popular party was the Swiss People's Party (SVP) which received 42% of the vote. The next three most popular parties were the Conservative Democratic Party (BDP) (20.9%), the Evangelical People's Party (EVP) (9.7%) and the Christian Social Party (CSP) (9.7%). In the federal election, a total of 416 votes were cast, and the voter turnout was 52.5%.

== Economy ==
As of 2011, Müntschemier had an unemployment rate of 1.84%. As of 2008, there were a total of 926 people employed in the municipality. Of these, there were 115 people employed in the primary economic sector and about 30 businesses involved in this sector. 193 people were employed in the secondary sector and there were 15 businesses in this sector. 618 people were employed in the tertiary sector, with 34 businesses in this sector. There were 625 residents of the municipality who were employed in some capacity, of which females made up 40.0% of the workforce.

In 2008 there were a total of 832 full-time equivalent jobs. The number of jobs in the primary sector was 90, all of which were in agriculture. The number of jobs in the secondary sector was 182 of which 164 or (90.1%) were in manufacturing and 19 (10.4%) were in construction. The number of jobs in the tertiary sector was 560. In the tertiary sector; 476 or 85.0% were in wholesale or retail sales or the repair of motor vehicles, 42 or 7.5% were in the movement and storage of goods, 12 or 2.1% were in a hotel or restaurant, 8 or 1.4% were in education and 3 or 0.5% were in health care.

In 2000, there were 284 workers who commuted into the municipality and 294 workers who commuted away. The municipality is a net exporter of workers, with about 1.0 workers leaving the municipality for every one entering. Of the working population, 12.2% used public transportation to get to work, and 41.3% used a private car.

== Religion ==
From the 2000 census, 221 or 20.0% were Roman Catholic, while 788 or 71.2% belonged to the Swiss Reformed Church. Of the rest of the population, there were 4 members of an Orthodox church (or about 0.36% of the population), and there were 38 individuals (or about 3.43% of the population) who belonged to another Christian church. There were 13 (or about 1.17% of the population) who were Islamic. There was 1 person who was Buddhist and 12 individuals who were Hindu. 31 (or about 2.80% of the population) belonged to no church, are agnostic or atheist, and 18 individuals (or about 1.63% of the population) did not answer the question.

== Education ==
In Müntschemier about 382 or (34.5%) of the population have completed non-mandatory upper secondary education, and 76 or (6.9%) have completed additional higher education (either university or a Fachhochschule). Of the 76 who completed tertiary schooling, 76.3% were Swiss men, 17.1% were Swiss women.

The Canton of Bern school system provides one year of non-obligatory Kindergarten, followed by six years of Primary school. This is followed by three years of obligatory lower Secondary school where the students are separated according to ability and aptitude. Following the lower Secondary students may attend additional schooling or they may enter an apprenticeship.

During the 2010-11 school year, there were a total of 116 students attending classes in Müntschemier. There were 2 kindergarten classes with a total of 26 students in the municipality. Of the kindergarten students, 38.5% were permanent or temporary residents of Switzerland (not citizens) and 38.5% have a different mother language than the classroom language. The municipality had 5 primary classes and 90 students. Of the primary students, 27.8% were permanent or temporary residents of Switzerland (not citizens) and 26.7% have a different mother language than the classroom language.

As of 2000, there were 6 students in Müntschemier who came from another municipality, while 63 residents attended schools outside the municipality.

== Twin towns – sister cities ==
Müntschemier is twinned with:

- Hardheim, Germany
