= Marais (given name) =

Marais is a masculine given name. Notable people with the name include:

- Marais Erasmus (born 1964), South African cricketer and umpire
- Marais Viljoen (1915–2007), the last ceremonial State President of South Africa from 1979 until 1984
