= Ins, Switzerland =

Municipality in Bern, Switzerland

Ins
- Municipality
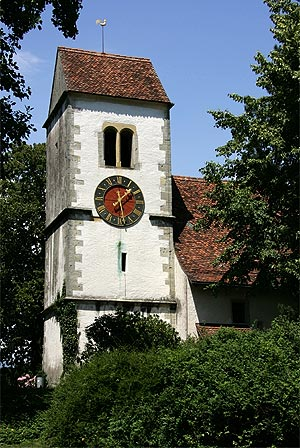
- Swiss Reformed Church in Ins

- Flag Coat of arms
- Location of Ins
- Location within Switzerland Location within Canton of Bern
- Coordinates: 47°0′N 7°6′E
- Country: Switzerland
- Canton: Bern
- District: Seeland

Government
  - Mayor: Hans Urech

Area
  - Total: 23.9 km^{2} (9.2 sq mi)
- Elevation: 437 m (1,434 ft)

Population (December 2020)
  - Total: 3,560
  - Density: 149/km^{2} (386/sq mi)
- Time zone: UTC+01:00 (CET)
  - Summer (DST): UTC+02:00 (CEST)
- Postal code: 3232
- SFOS number: 496
- ISO 3166 code: CH-BE
- Surrounded by: Brüttelen, Cudrefin (VD), Erlach, Gampelen, Laténa (NE), Lüscherz, Mont-Vully (FR), Müntschemier, Tschugg, Vinelz
- Website: ins-anet.ch

Ins (German: [ɪns]; French: Anet [anɛt]) is a municipality in the Seeland administrative district in the canton of Bern in Switzerland.

== History ==
Aerial view (1954)

Ins is first mentioned in 1009 as Anestre. In 1179 it was mentioned as Anes.

The area around Ins has been inhabited since at least the Iron Age. On Schaltenrain hill, individual graves and groups of grave mounds have been found stretching over 2 km (1.2 mi) of the hill. At least four different sites have been discovered. The first excavation was carried out under the direction of Gustav von Bonstetten in 1848, who placed his discoveries in the Historical Museum of Berne. In the following year, Emanuel F. Müller excavated other sites on the hill. The third large excavation was in 1908-09 under Jakob Heierli, who placed his finds in the Museum Schwab in Bienne. Due to the number and variety of artifacts, smaller sites and individual items continue to be discovered.

Bonstetten's excavations discovered a minimum of ten grave mounds, 1.8–4.5 m (5.9–14.8 ft) in height, arraigned in a line. The sixth mound contained two Hallstatt "wagon graves" (graves containing wagons or parts of a wagon) from the 7th century BC. Golden objects found in this mound and other nearby mounds show an Etruscan influence or were produced on the Italian peninsula and traded. In addition to gold and the wagons, jewelry made from glass, amber, lignite, pearls and bronze were found. An early La Tène iron sword from the 5th century BC was also found. The richness of the finds and the relatively long settlement duration indicates that this was a wealthy and successful settlement that traded with the Mediterranean.

During the Roman era there was a wide band of settlements that stretched from the Grosses Moos marsh up into the vineyard covered hills. A Roman road ran through the march and connected the settlements with the Roman towns of the Swiss Plateau.

During the Middle Ages Fenis Castle, the seat of the Counts of Fenis, was built on the Hasenburg which is now part of the municipality of Ins. During the Late Middle Ages the village was part of the Herrschaft of Erlach. During the Burgundian Wars, the village along with the Herrschaft of Erlach was annexed by Bern. Under the new Bernese Bailiwick of Erlach, Ins remained an important regional administration center.

The former village church of St. Mary was first mentioned as a romanesque building in 1228. However, since it was located close to an early medieval cemetery, it was probably built over or near an earlier church. It was rebuilt in the 16th and 17th centuries. The church's patronage rights were held by the Cathedral of Bern until the Protestant Reformation ended it in the 16th century.

Historically the village was surrounded by extensive vineyards. The nearby Grosses Moos marsh was a source of peat from the 18th until the early 20th century. The village was a regional administration and financial center. The old Rathaus was used as the seat of the low court until it burned down in 1848. The village Landgerichtsplatz held the stone Landstuhl for the Landvogt and benches for his court. A tithe barn was built in 1680 for the parish. During the 17th and 18th century wealthy landowners built elegant manor houses in the village, including the Schlössli, Lilienhof, Altes Spital and Wagnerhaus.

== Geography ==
Ins has an area of 23.87 km^{2} (9.22 sq mi). Of this area, 15.93 km^{2} (6.15 mi^{2}) or 66.8% is used for agricultural purposes, while 5.01 km^{2} (1.93 mi^{2}) or 21.0% is forested. Of the rest of the land, 2.28 km^{2} (0.88 mi^{2}) or 9.6% is settled (buildings or roads), 0.38 km^{2} (0.15 mi^{2}) or 1.6% is either rivers or lakes and 0.3 km^{2} (0.12 mi^{2}) or 1.3% is unproductive land.

Of the built up area, housing and buildings made up 4.3% and transportation infrastructure made up 4.0%. Out of the forested land, all of the forested land area is covered with heavy forests. Of the agricultural land, 59.7% is used for growing crops and 6.1% is pastures. Of the water in the municipality, 0.4% is in lakes and 1.2% is in rivers and streams.

Ins is located on the southern slope of the Schaltenrain (592 m (1,942 ft)) and stretches over part of the Grand Marais, a particularly productive area with nearly black soil in the Bernese Seeland. On the south it is bordered by Lake Neuchatel and the Broye Canal. It includes the settlement of Witzwil im Moos and several scattered, individual farm houses.

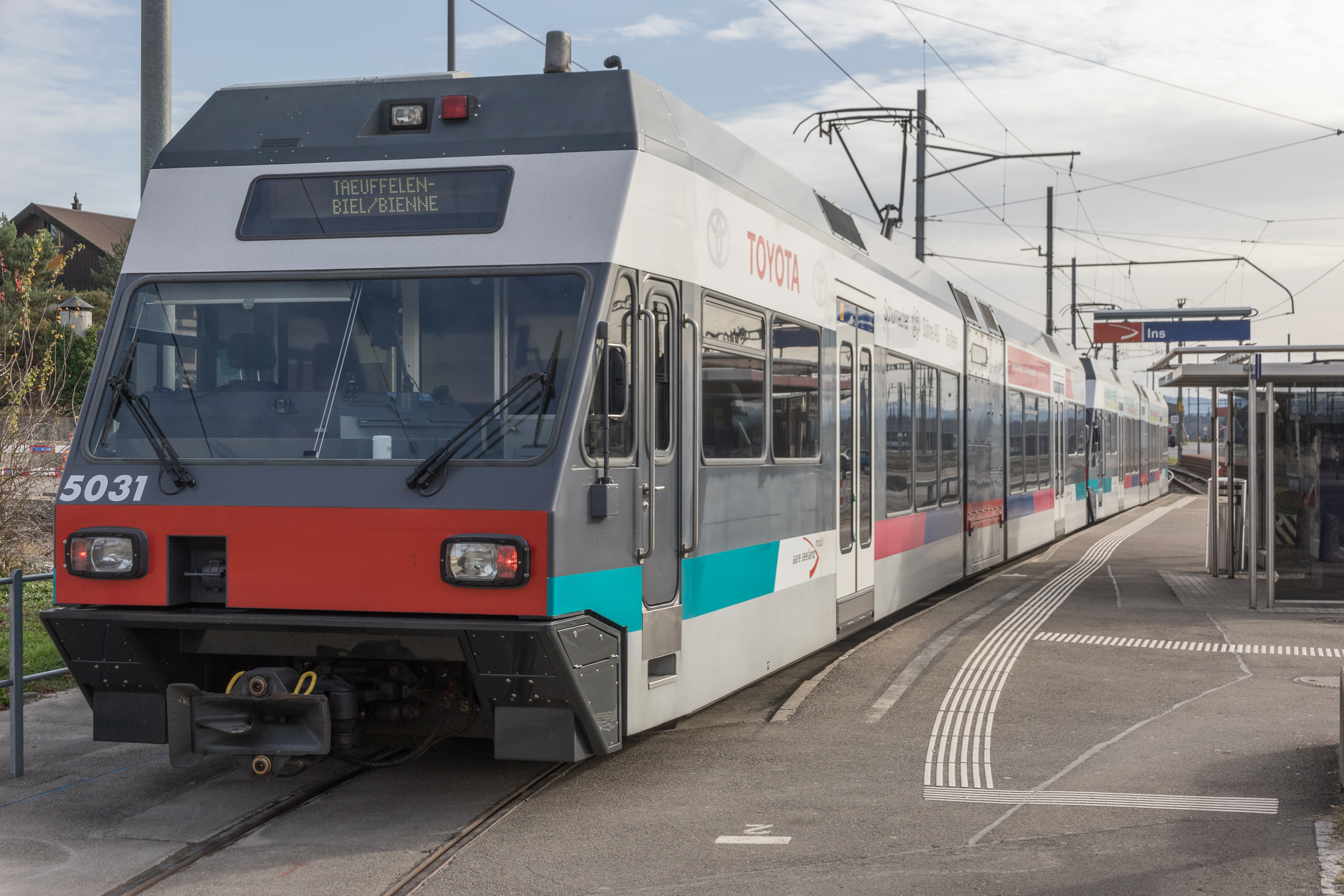
BTI station Ins

Despite being a small municipality, Ins serves as a center for the neighbouring communities, which are even smaller in both population and area. Ins lies at the end of the Bienne-Täuffelen-Ins (BTI) rail line, and is also served by the Ins-Erlach postbus.

On 31 December 2009 Amtsbezirk Erlach, the municipality's former district, was dissolved. On the following day, 1 January 2010, it joined the newly created Verwaltungskreis Seeland.

== Coat of arms ==
The blazon of the municipal coat of arms is Or a Mullet Gules between a Ploughshare Azure in bend and a Sickle of the same in bend sinister and Mount of 3 Coupeaux Vert.

== Demographics ==
Ins has a population (as of December 2020) of 3,560. As of 2010, 15.0% of the population are resident foreign nationals. Over the last 10 years (2000-2010) the population has changed at a rate of 16.2%. Migration accounted for 15.3%, while births and deaths accounted for 0.7%.

Most of the population (as of 2000) speaks German (2,685 or 91.1%) as their first language, French is the second most common (105 or 3.6%) and Albanian is the third (28 or 1.0%). There are 21 people who speak Italian and 3 people who speak Romansh.

As of 2008, the population was 47.8% male and 52.2% female. The population was made up of 1,283 Swiss men (39.7% of the population) and 259 (8.0%) non-Swiss men. There were 1,461 Swiss women (45.2%) and 22 (0.7%) non-Swiss women. Of the population in the municipality, 990 or about 33.6% were born in Ins and lived there in 2000. There were 978 or 33.2% who were born in the same canton, while 558 or 18.9% were born somewhere else in Switzerland, and 323 or 11.0% were born outside of Switzerland.

As of 2010, children and teenagers (0–19 years old) make up 22.8% of the population, while adults (20–64 years old) make up 60% and seniors (over 64 years old) make up 17.2%.

As of 2000, there were 1,235 people who were single and never married in the municipality. There were 1,437 married individuals, 175 widows or widowers and 100 individuals who are divorced.

As of 2000, there were 334 households that consist of only one person and 73 households with five or more people. In 2000, a total of 1,104 apartments (90.9% of the total) were permanently occupied, while 67 apartments (5.5%) were seasonally occupied and 44 apartments (3.6%) were empty. As of 2010, the construction rate of new housing units was 13 new units per 1000 residents. The vacancy rate for the municipality, in 2011, was 1.06%.

The historical population is given in the following chart:

== Heritage sites of national significance ==
The Albert Anker house, the farm house Himmelriich and the earthen fortifications at Fenis are listed as Swiss heritage site of national significance. The entire village of Ins is part of the Inventory of Swiss Heritage Sites.

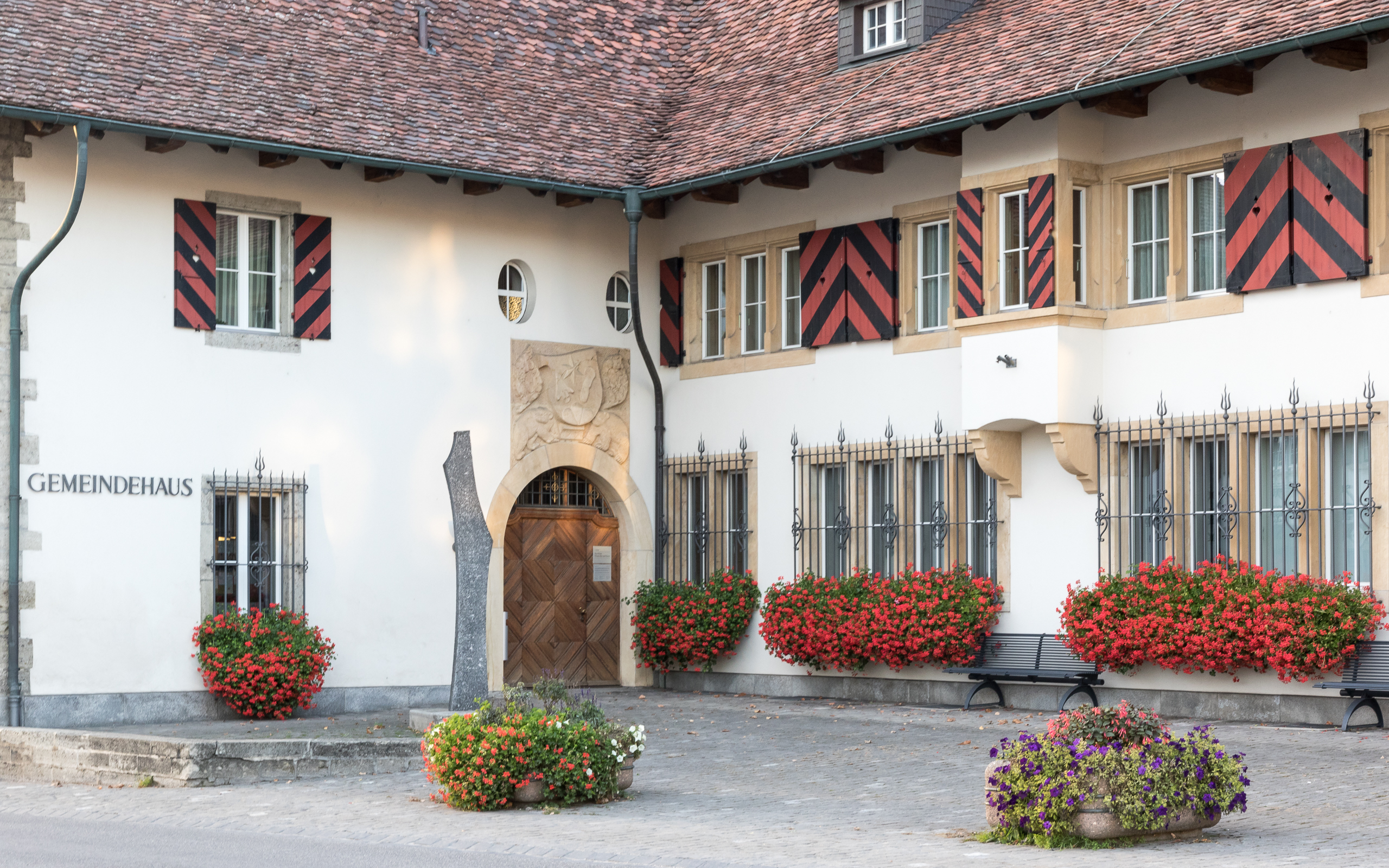
Parish Hall in Ins BE

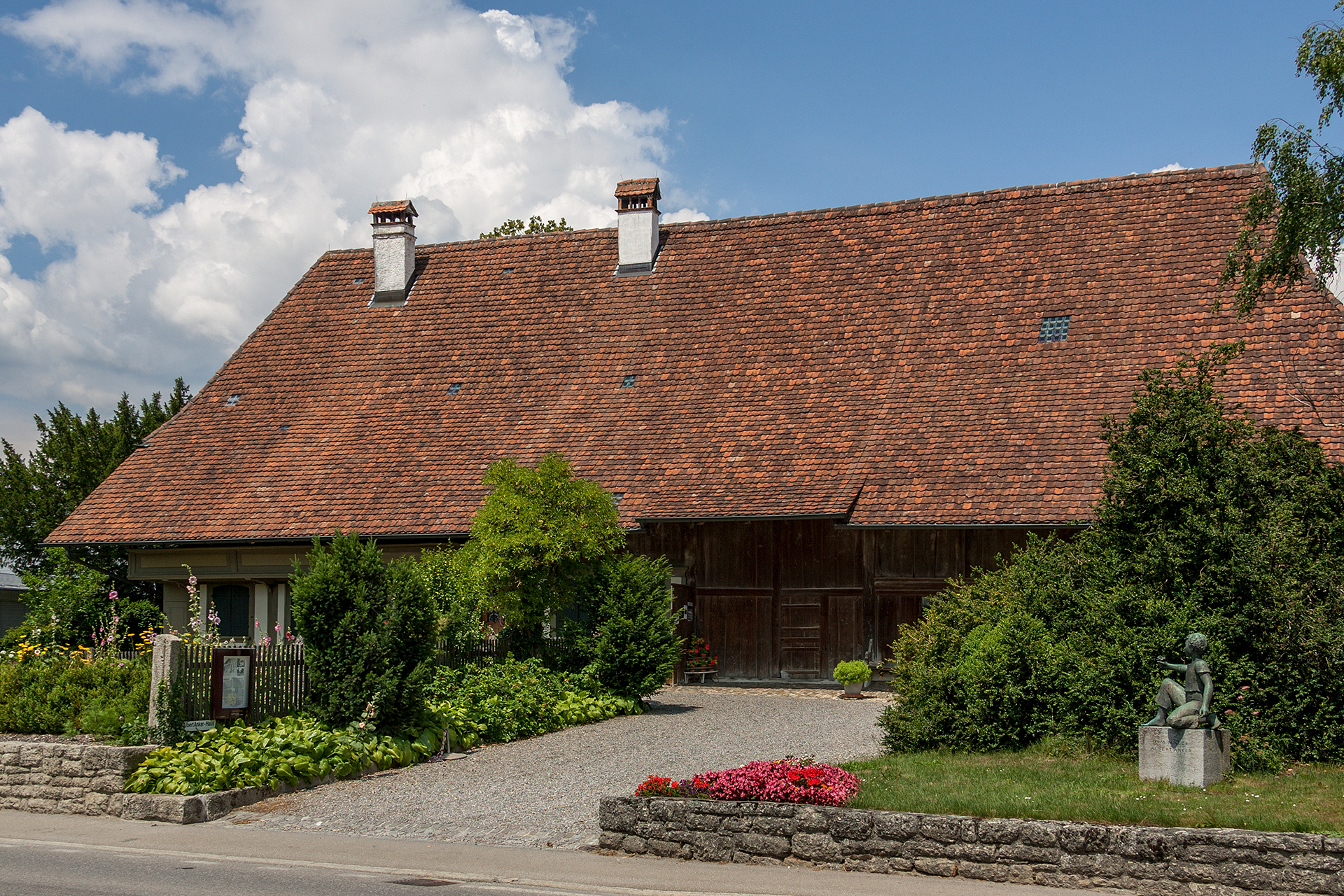
Albert Anker House

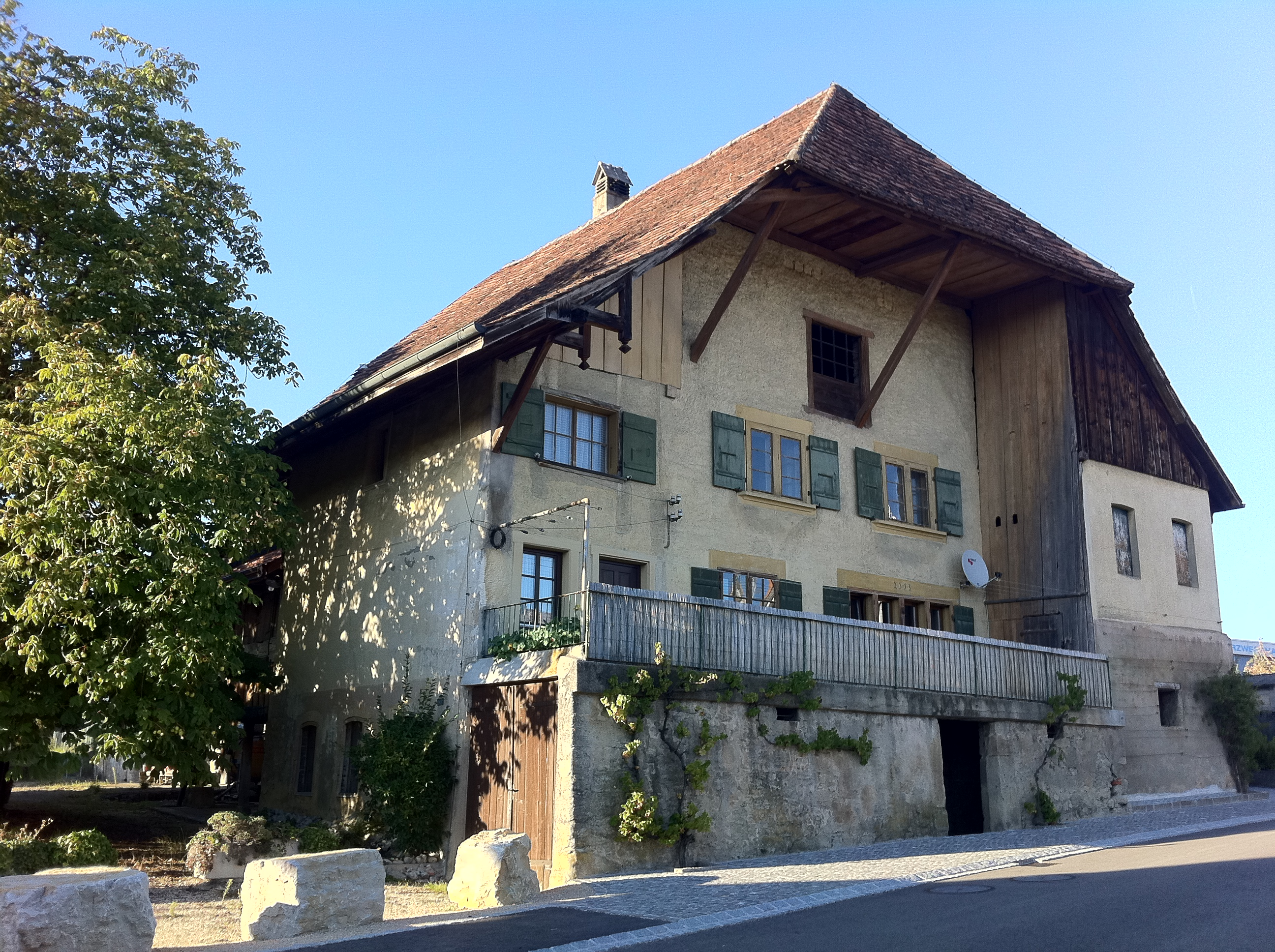
Farm House (Himmelriich)

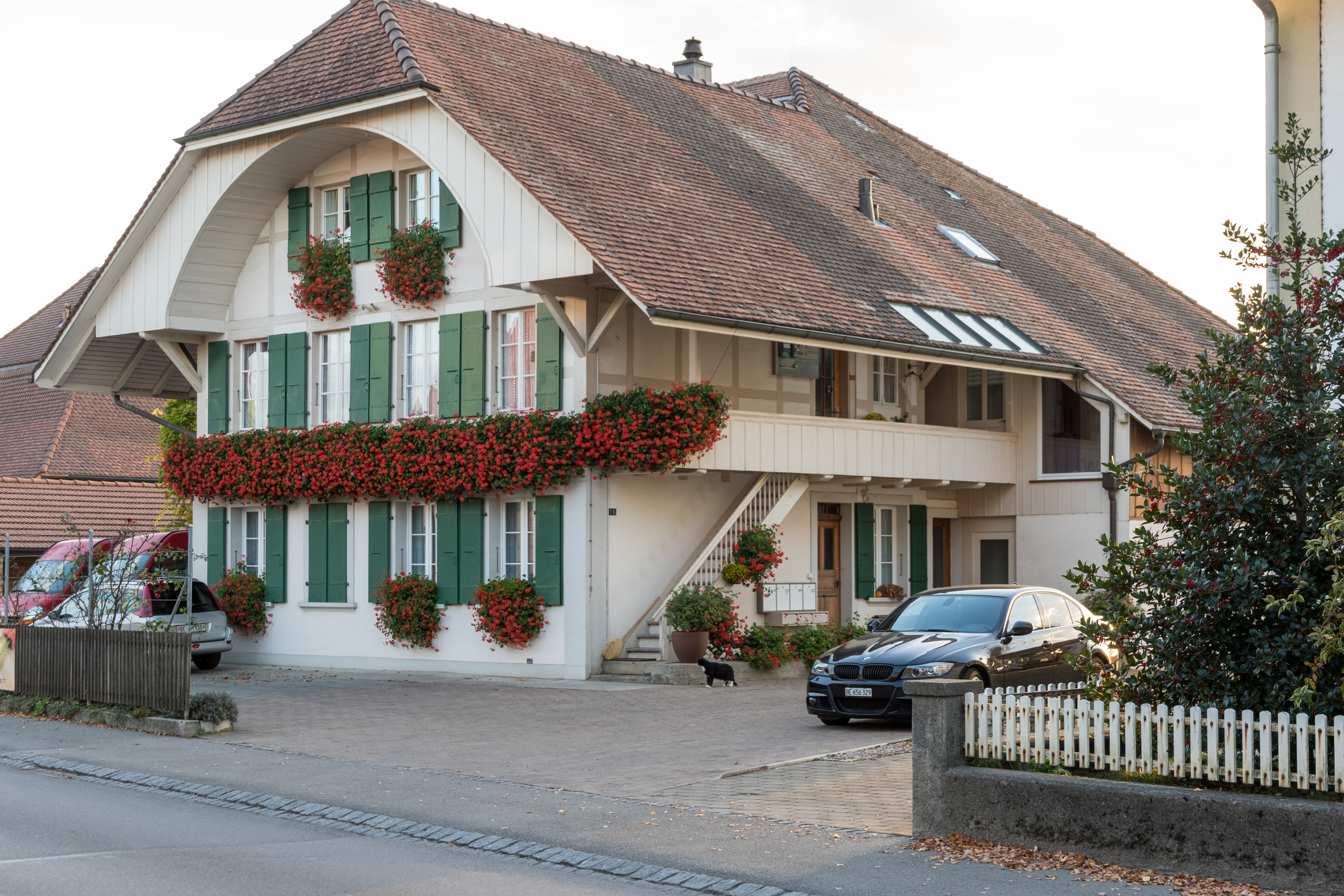
Moosgasse 16

== Politics ==
In the 2011 federal election the most popular party was the Swiss People's Party (SVP) which received 30.4% of the vote. The next three most popular parties were the Social Democratic Party (SP) (18.7%), the Conservative Democratic Party (BDP) (17.2%) and the Green Party (11.3%). In the federal election, a total of 1,237 votes were cast, and the voter turnout was 55.2%.

== Economy ==
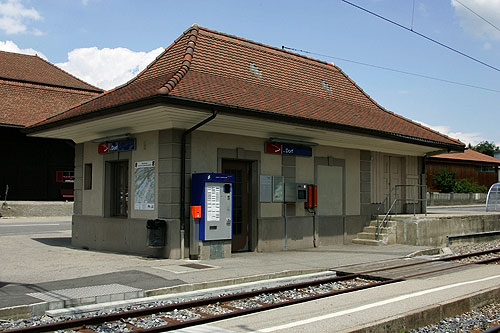
Ins village train station

As of 2011, Ins had an unemployment rate of 1.51%. As of 2008, there were a total of 1,487 people employed in the municipality. Of these, there were 234 people employed in the primary economic sector and about 57 businesses involved in this sector. 231 people were employed in the secondary sector and there were 31 businesses in this sector. 1,022 people were employed in the tertiary sector, with 127 businesses in this sector. There were 1,526 residents of the municipality who were employed in some capacity, of which females made up 40.2% of the workforce.

In 2008 there were a total of 1,174 full-time equivalent jobs. The number of jobs in the primary sector was 186, of which 181 were in agriculture and 5 were in forestry or lumber production. The number of jobs in the secondary sector was 215 of which 84 or (39.1%) were in manufacturing and 128 (59.5%) were in construction. The number of jobs in the tertiary sector was 773. In the tertiary sector; 247 or 32.0% were in wholesale or retail sales or the repair of motor vehicles, 63 or 8.2% were in the movement and storage of goods, 21 or 2.7% were in a hotel or restaurant, 15 or 1.9% were in the information industry, 16 or 2.1% were the insurance or financial industry, 87 or 11.3% were technical professionals or scientists, 35 or 4.5% were in education and 211 or 27.3% were in health care.

In 2000, there were 589 workers who commuted into the municipality and 832 workers who commuted away. The municipality is a net exporter of workers, with about 1.4 workers leaving the municipality for every one entering. Of the working population, 18.2% used public transportation to get to work, and 43.3% used a private car.

== Religion ==
From the 2000 census, 344 or 11.7% were Roman Catholic, while 2,115 or 71.8% belonged to the Swiss Reformed Church. Of the rest of the population, there were 22 members of an Orthodox church (or about 0.75% of the population), there were 2 individuals (or about 0.07% of the population) who belonged to the Christian Catholic Church, and there were 109 individuals (or about 3.70% of the population) who belonged to another Christian church. There was 1 individual who was Jewish, and 95 (or about 3.22% of the population) who were Islamic. There were 6 individuals who were Buddhist, 2 individuals who were Hindu and 2 individuals who belonged to another church. 219 (or about 7.43% of the population) belonged to no church, are agnostic or atheist, and 80 individuals (or about 2.71% of the population) did not answer the question.

== Education ==
In Ins about 1,118 or (37.9%) of the population have completed non-mandatory upper secondary education, and 398 or (13.5%) have completed additional higher education (either university or a Fachhochschule). Of the 398 who completed tertiary schooling, 69.1% were Swiss men, 21.6% were Swiss women, 6.0% were non-Swiss men and 3.3% were non-Swiss women.

The Canton of Bern school system provides one year of non-obligatory Kindergarten, followed by six years of Primary school. This is followed by three years of obligatory lower Secondary school where the students are separated according to ability and aptitude. Following the lower Secondary students may attend additional schooling or they may enter an apprenticeship.

During the 2010–11 school year, there were a total of 625 students attending classes in Ins. There were 3 kindergarten classes with a total of 69 students in the municipality. Of the kindergarten students, 14.5% were permanent or temporary residents of Switzerland (not citizens) and 21.7% have a different mother language than the classroom language. The municipality had 12 primary classes and 244 students. Of the primary students, 14.3% were permanent or temporary residents of Switzerland (not citizens) and 16.4% have a different mother language than the classroom language. During the same year, there were 12 lower secondary classes with a total of 240 students. There were 10.8% who were permanent or temporary residents of Switzerland (not citizens) and 17.1% have a different mother language than the classroom language.

As of 2000, there were 174 students in Ins who came from another municipality, while 75 residents attended schools outside the municipality.

Ins is home to the Bibliothek Ins library. The library has (as of 2008) 8,573 books or other media, and loaned out 33,937 items in the same year. It was open a total of 204 days with average of 23 hours per week during that year.

== Transportation ==
The municipality has two railway stations, Ins and Ins Dorf. The first of these is an interchange on the standard gauge Bern–Neuchâtel and Fribourg–Ins lines and the narrow-gauge Biel–Täuffelen–Ins line. It has regular service to Bern, La Chaux-de-Fonds, Neuchâtel, Fribourg/Freiburg, and Biel/Bienne. Ins Dorf is located in the centre of Ins on the Biel–Täuffelen–Ins line

== Famous residents ==
The Swiss painter and illustrator Albert Anker lived in Ins until his death in 1910.
