= Grand Marais, Seeland =

Seeland is a region in Switzerland

Coordinates: 46°58′39″N 7°06′36″E

Grand Marais (German: Grosses Moos) in Seeland is a region in Switzerland, at the foot of the first range of the Jura Mountains, contained by the three lakes of Morat (Murten), Neuchâtel (Neuenburg) and Bienne (Biel). Prior to major hydrological works (the Jura water correction), it was a marshland that covered 62.5 km^{2} (24.1 sq mi). The entire Grand Marais, along with the whole of Seeland, was prone to very severe recurring floods before the correction.

After the Jura water correction, the former marshland became very valuable agricultural land, and made the whole area the most important region in Switzerland for growing vegetables.

The main town and centre of vegetable trading is Müntschemier.

There are two prisons with surrounding agricultural compounds: Bellechasse (Witzwil) and St. Johannsen.
