= Busswil BE railway station =

Railway station in Lyss, Switzerland

Busswil BE
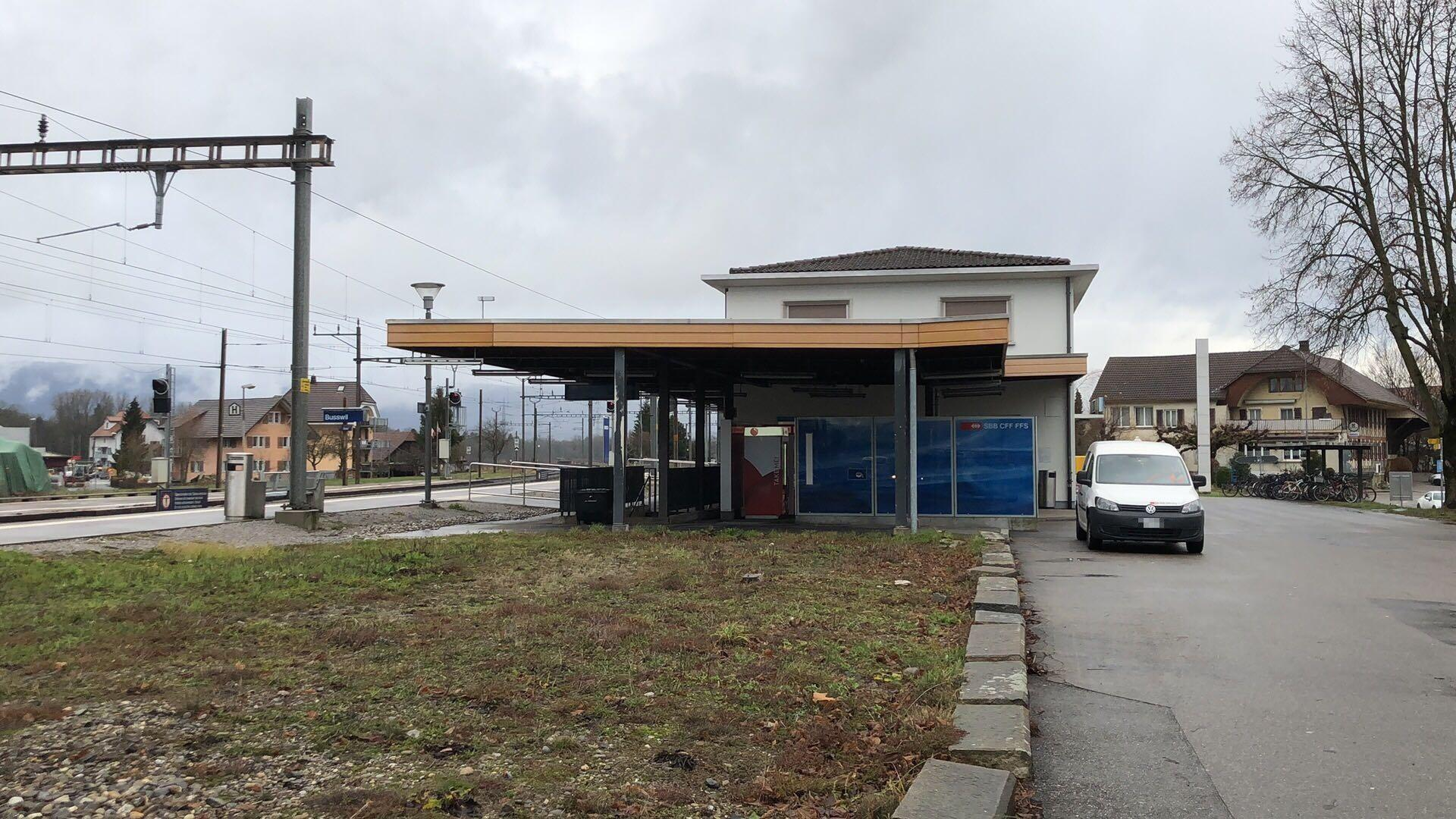
- The station building in 2018

General information
- Location: Lyss; Switzerland
- Coordinates: 47°05′55″N 7°19′07″E
- Elevation: 437 m (1,434 ft)
- Owner: Swiss Federal Railways
- Lines: Biel/Bienne–Bern line; Lyss–Solothurn line
- Platforms: 3: 1 side platform; 1 island platform
- Tracks: 3
- Train operators: BLS AG

Construction
- Parking: Yes (30 spaces)
- Accessible: Yes

Other information
- Station code: 8504415 (BUS)
- Fare zone: 311 (Libero)

Passengers
- 2023: 1'900 per weekday (BLS)

Services
Preceding station	Bern S-Bahn	Following station
Studen BE towards Biel/Bienne	S3	Lyss towards Belp
Dotzigen towards Büren an der Aare	S36	Lyss Terminus
Location

Busswil BE railway station (German: Bahnhof Busswil BE) is a railway station in the municipality of Lyss, in the Swiss canton of Bern. It sits at the junction of the standard gauge Biel/Bienne–Bern and Lyss–Solothurn line of Swiss Federal Railways.

== Services ==
As of the December 2024 timetable change, the following services stop at Busswil BE:

- Bern S-Bahn
  - S3: half-hourly service between Biel/Bienne and Belp.
  - S36: half-hourly or hourly service between Büren an der Aare and Lyss.
