= Dotzigen railway station =

Railway station in Dotzigen, Switzerland

Dotzigen
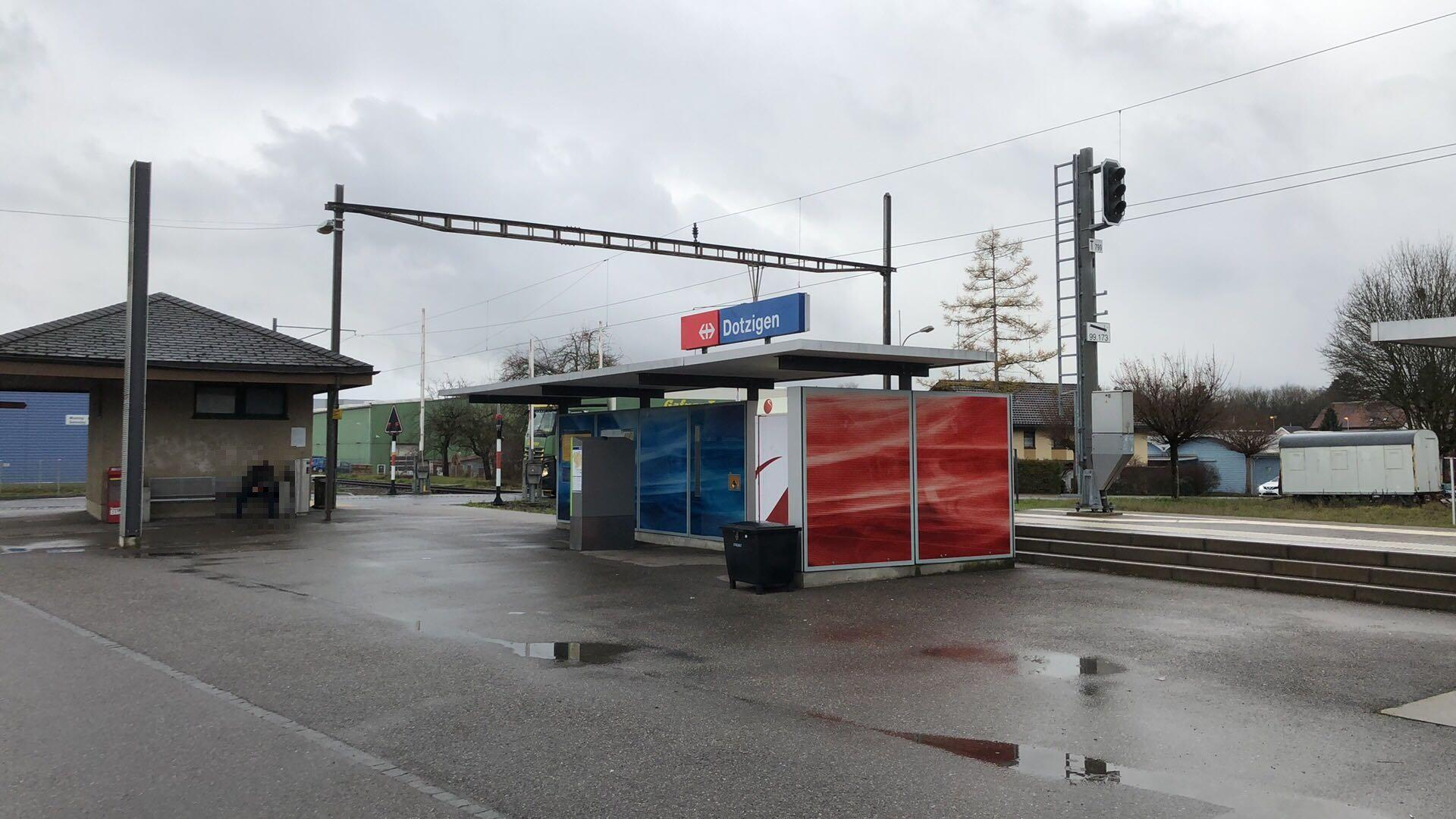
- The station platform in 2018

General information
- Location: Dotzigen; Switzerland
- Coordinates: 47°07′07″N 7°20′16″E
- Elevation: 434 m (1,424 ft)
- Owner: Swiss Federal Railways
- Line: Lyss–Solothurn line
- Platforms: 1 side platform
- Tracks: 1
- Train operators: BLS AG

Construction
- Parking: None available
- Cycle facilities: Yes (30 spaces)
- Accessible: Yes

Other information
- Station code: 8500220 (DON)
- Fare zone: 311 (Libero)

Passengers
- 2023: 410 per weekday (BLS)

Services
Preceding station	Bern S-Bahn	Following station
Büren an der Aare Terminus	S36	Busswil BE towards Lyss
Location

Dotzigen railway station (German: Bahnhof Dotzigen) is a railway station in the municipality of Dotzigen, in the Swiss canton of Bern. It is an intermediate stop on the standard gauge Lyss–Solothurn line of Swiss Federal Railways.

== Services ==
As of the December 2024 timetable change, the following services stop at Dotzigen:

- Bern S-Bahn S36: half-hourly or hourly service between Büren an der Aare and Lyss.
