= Suberg-Grossaffoltern railway station =

Railway station in Grossaffoltern, Switzerland

Suberg-Grossaffoltern
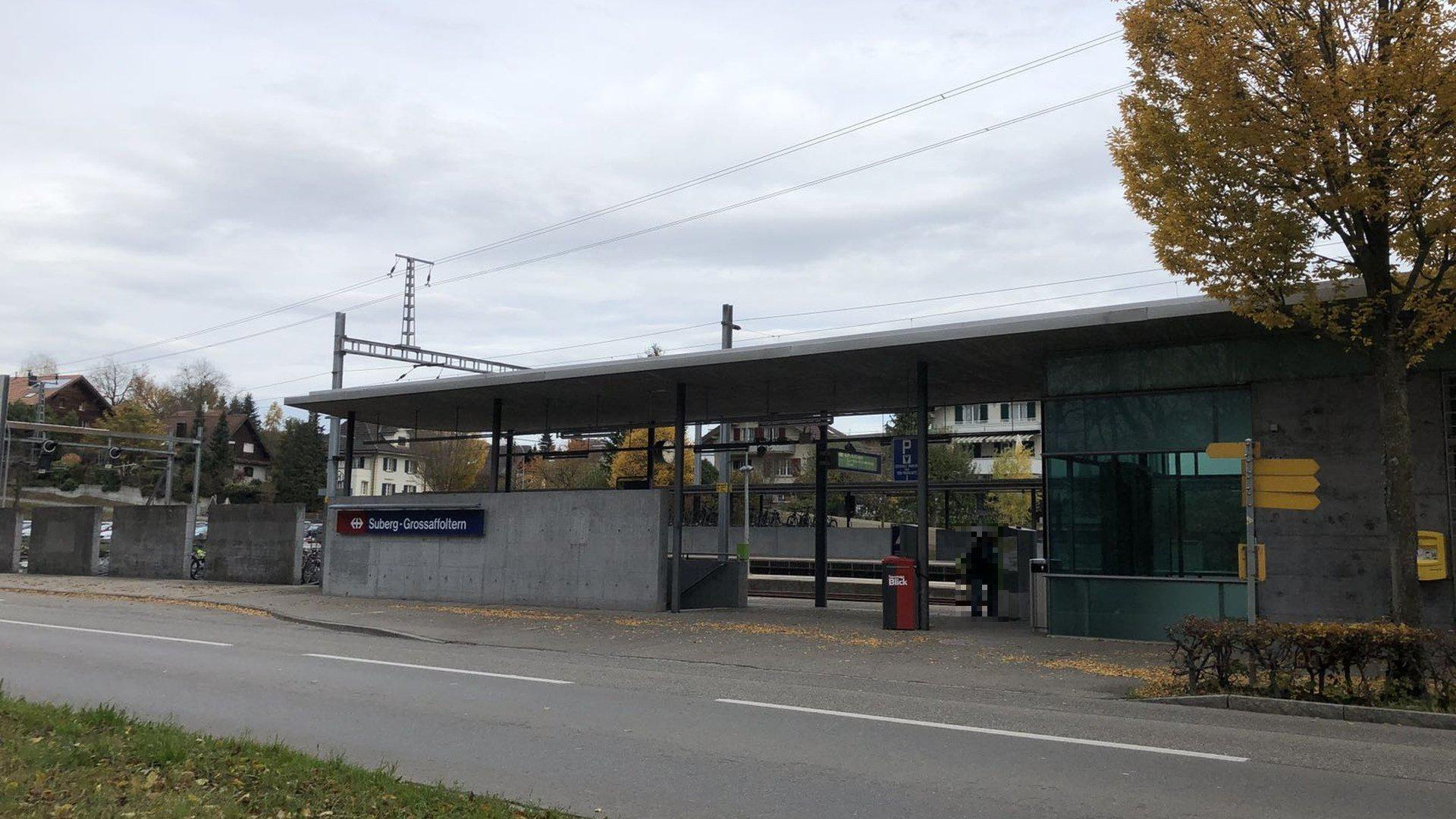
- The station platform in 2018

General information
- Location: Grossaffoltern; Switzerland
- Coordinates: 47°03′32″N 7°20′20″E
- Elevation: 476 m (1,562 ft)
- Owner: Swiss Federal Railways
- Line: Biel/Bienne–Bern line
- Platforms: 2 side platforms
- Tracks: 2
- Train operators: BLS AG

Construction
- Parking: Yes (72 spaces)
- Cycle facilities: Yes (186 spaces)
- Accessible: Partly

Other information
- Station code: 8504413 (SUB)
- Fare zone: 310 (Libero)

Passengers
- 2023: 660 per weekday (BLS)

Services
Preceding station	Bern S-Bahn	Following station
Lyss towards Biel/Bienne	S3	Schüpfen towards Belp
Location

Suberg-Grossaffoltern railway station (German: Bahnhof Suberg-Grossaffoltern) is a railway station in the municipality of Grossaffoltern, in the Swiss canton of Bern. It is an intermediate stop on the standard gauge Biel/Bienne–Bern line of Swiss Federal Railways.

== Services ==
As of the December 2024 timetable change, the following services stop at Suberg-Grossaffoltern:

- Bern S-Bahn S3: half-hourly service between Biel/Bienne and Belp.
