= Aarberg railway station =

Railway station in Aarberg, Switzerland

Aarberg
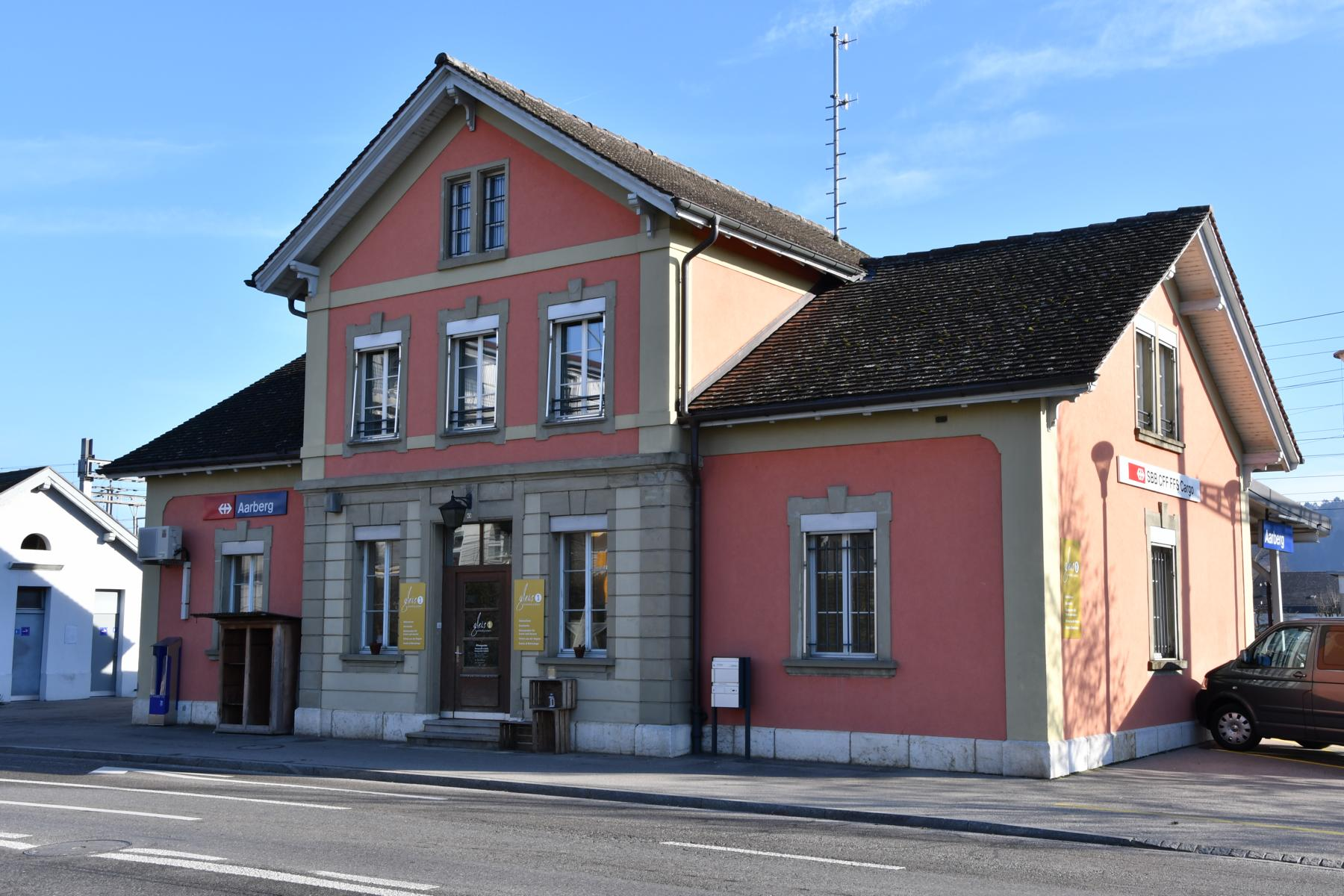
- The station building in 2020

General information
- Location: Aarberg; Switzerland
- Coordinates: 47°02′40″N 7°16′43″E
- Elevation: 448 m (1,470 ft)
- Owner: Swiss Federal Railways
- Line: Palézieux–Lyss railway line
- Distance: 95.5 km (59.3 mi) from Lausanne
- Platforms: 1 side platform
- Tracks: 4
- Train operators: BLS AG
- Connections: PostAuto AG bus lines; Bürgerbus WETA bus line

Construction
- Cycle facilities: Yes (94 spaces)
- Accessible: Yes

Other information
- Station code: 8504404 (ABE)
- Fare zone: 310 (Libero)

Passengers
- 2023: 620 per weekday (BLS)

Services
Preceding station	Bern S-Bahn	Following station
Bargen BE towards Kerzers	S35	Lyss Grien towards Lyss
Location

Aarberg railway station (German: Bahnhof Aarberg) is a railway station in the municipality of Aarberg, in the Swiss canton of Bern. It is an intermediate stop on the standard gauge Palézieux–Lyss railway line of Swiss Federal Railways.

== Services ==
The following services stop at Aarberg:

- Bern S-Bahn S35: hourly service between Kerzers and Lyss.

== Gallery ==
aerial view 1919

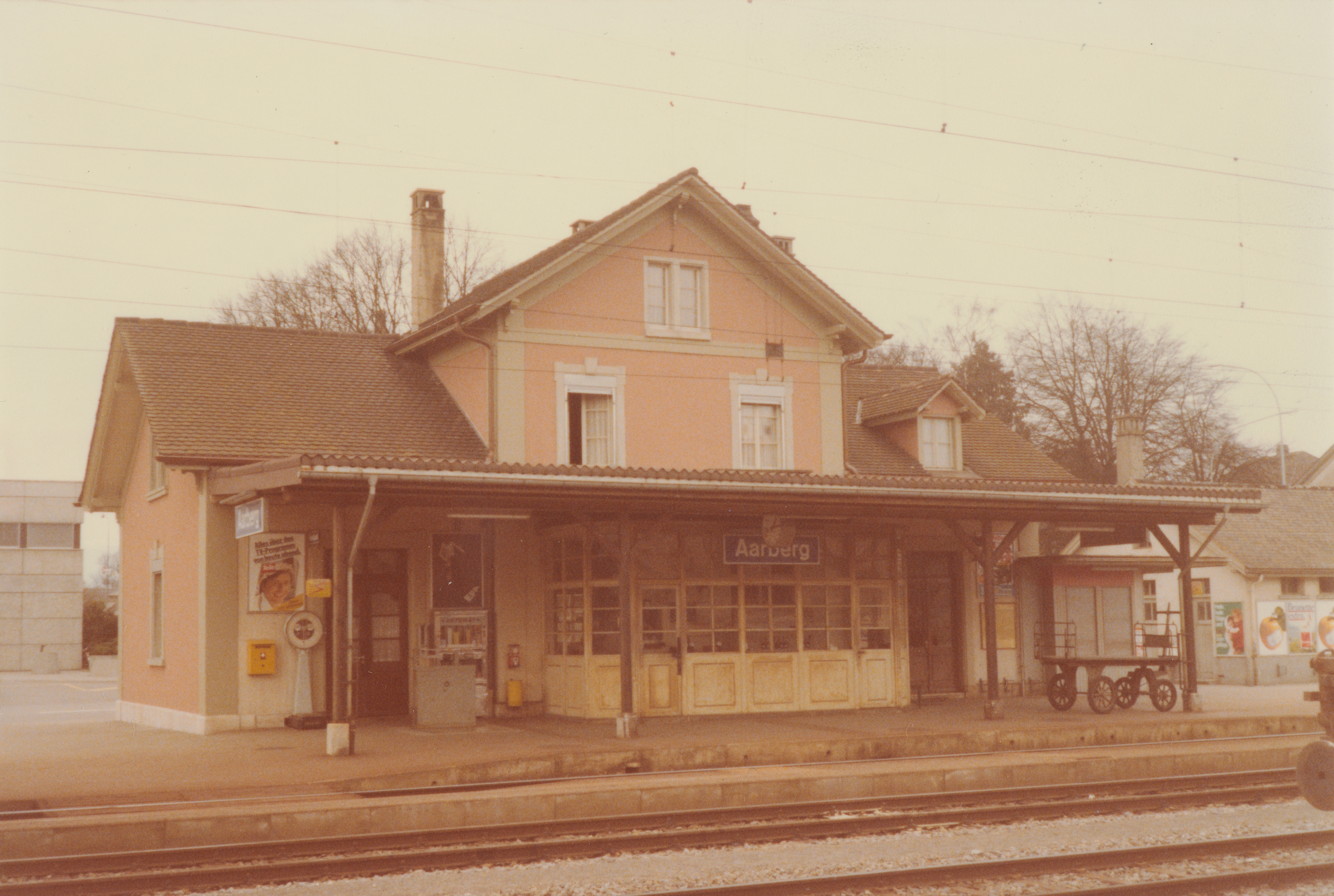
station building (1979)

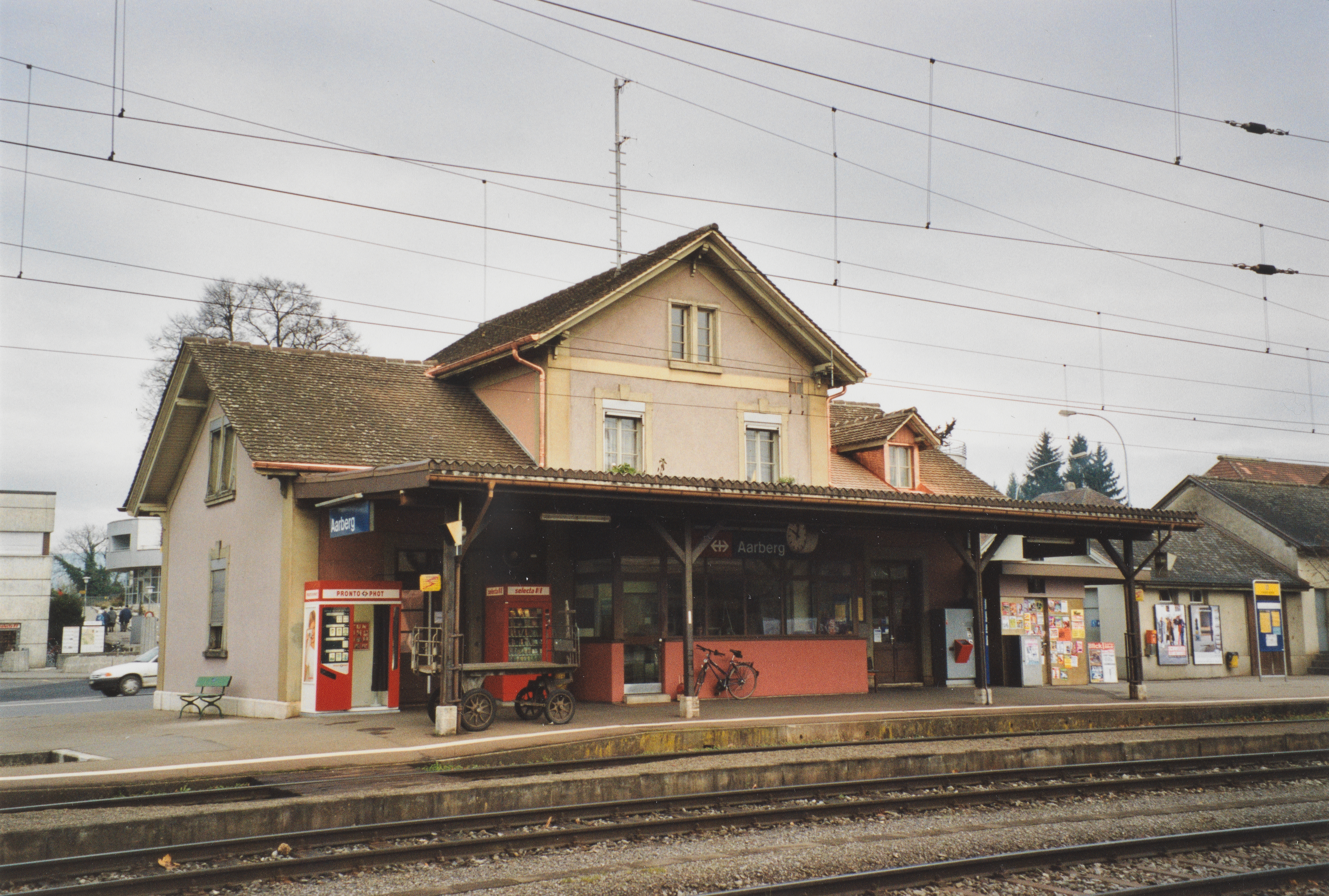
station building (2001)
