= Brugg railway station =

Brugg railway station could refer to:

- Brugg AG railway station in Brugg, Aargau, Switzerland
- Brügg BE railway station in Brügg, Bern, Switzerland

== See also ==
- Brig railway station
- Brugge railway station
