= Studen BE railway station =

Railway station in Studen BE, Switzerland

Studen BE
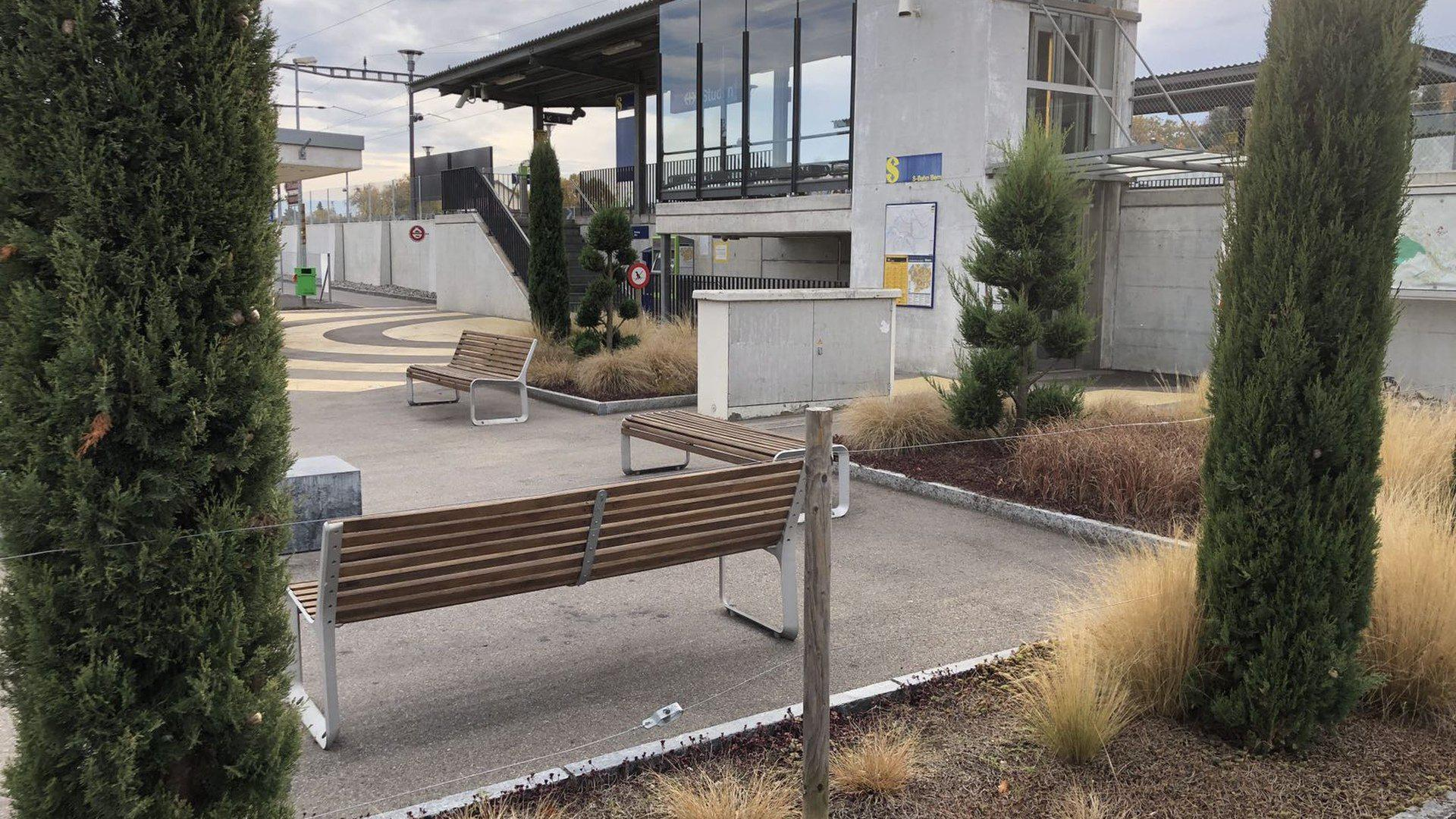
- The station entrance in 2018

General information
- Location: Studen; Switzerland
- Coordinates: 47°06′38″N 7°18′06″E
- Elevation: 436 m (1,430 ft)
- Owner: Swiss Federal Railways
- Line: Biel/Bienne–Bern line
- Platforms: 2 side platforms
- Tracks: 2
- Train operators: BLS AG

Construction
- Cycle facilities: Yes (180 spaces)
- Accessible: Yes

Other information
- Station code: 8504441 (STU)
- Fare zone: 301 (Libero)

Passengers
- 2023: 980 per weekday (BLS)

Services
Preceding station	Bern S-Bahn	Following station
Brügg BE towards Biel/Bienne	S3	Busswil BE towards Belp
Location

Studen BE railway station (German: Bahnhof Studen BE) is a railway station in the municipality of Studen, in the Swiss canton of Bern. It is an intermediate stop on the standard gauge Biel/Bienne–Bern line of Swiss Federal Railways.

== Services ==
As of the December 2024 timetable change, the following services stop at Studen BE:

- Bern S-Bahn S3: half-hourly service between Biel/Bienne and Belp.
