= Schüpfen railway station =

Railway station in Schüpfen, Switzerland

Schüpfen
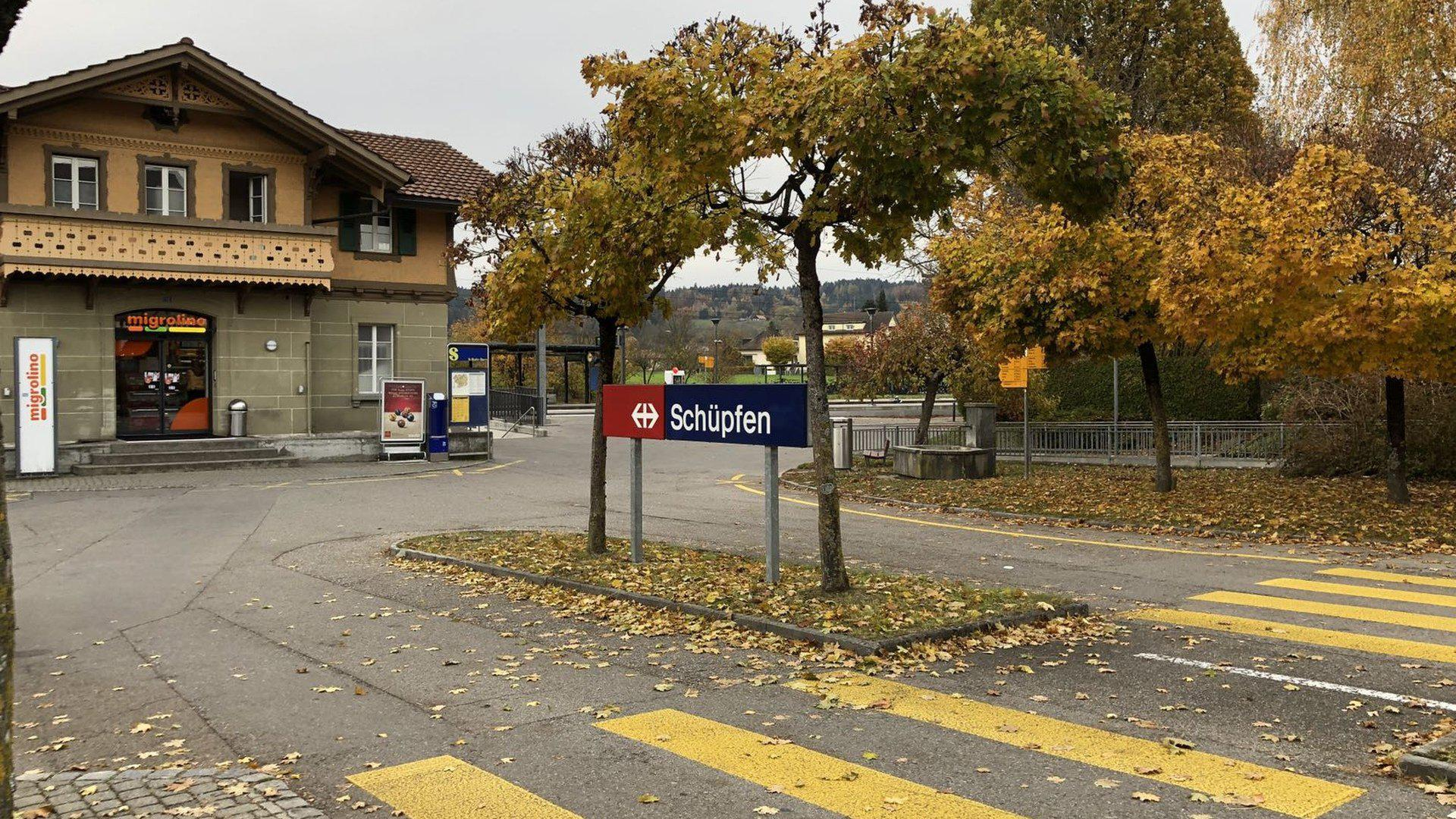
- The station in 2018

General information
- Location: Schüpfen; Switzerland
- Coordinates: 47°02′31″N 7°23′10″E
- Elevation: 519 m (1,703 ft)
- Owner: Swiss Federal Railways
- Line: Biel/Bienne–Bern line
- Platforms: 2 side platforms
- Tracks: 2
- Train operators: BLS AG

Construction
- Parking: Yes (54 spaces)
- Cycle facilities: Yes (362 spaces)
- Accessible: Yes

Other information
- Station code: 8504412 (SCUE)
- Fare zone: 124 (Libero)

Passengers
- 2023: 1'600 per weekday (BLS)

Services
Preceding station	Bern S-Bahn	Following station
Suberg-Grossaffoltern towards Biel/Bienne	S3	Münchenbuchsee towards Belp
Lyss towards Biel/Bienne	S31	Münchenbuchsee towards Belp
Location

Schüpfen railway station (German: Bahnhof Schüpfen) is a railway station in the municipality of Schüpfen, in the Swiss canton of Bern. It is an intermediate stop on the standard gauge Biel/Bienne–Bern line of Swiss Federal Railways.

== Services ==
As of the December 2024 timetable change, the following services stop at Schüpfen:

- Bern S-Bahn:
  - S3: half-hourly service between Biel/Bienne and Belp.
  - S31: rush-hour service between Biel/Bienne and Belp.
