= Kerzers Papiliorama railway station =

Railway station in Kerzers, Switzerland

Kerzers Papiliorama
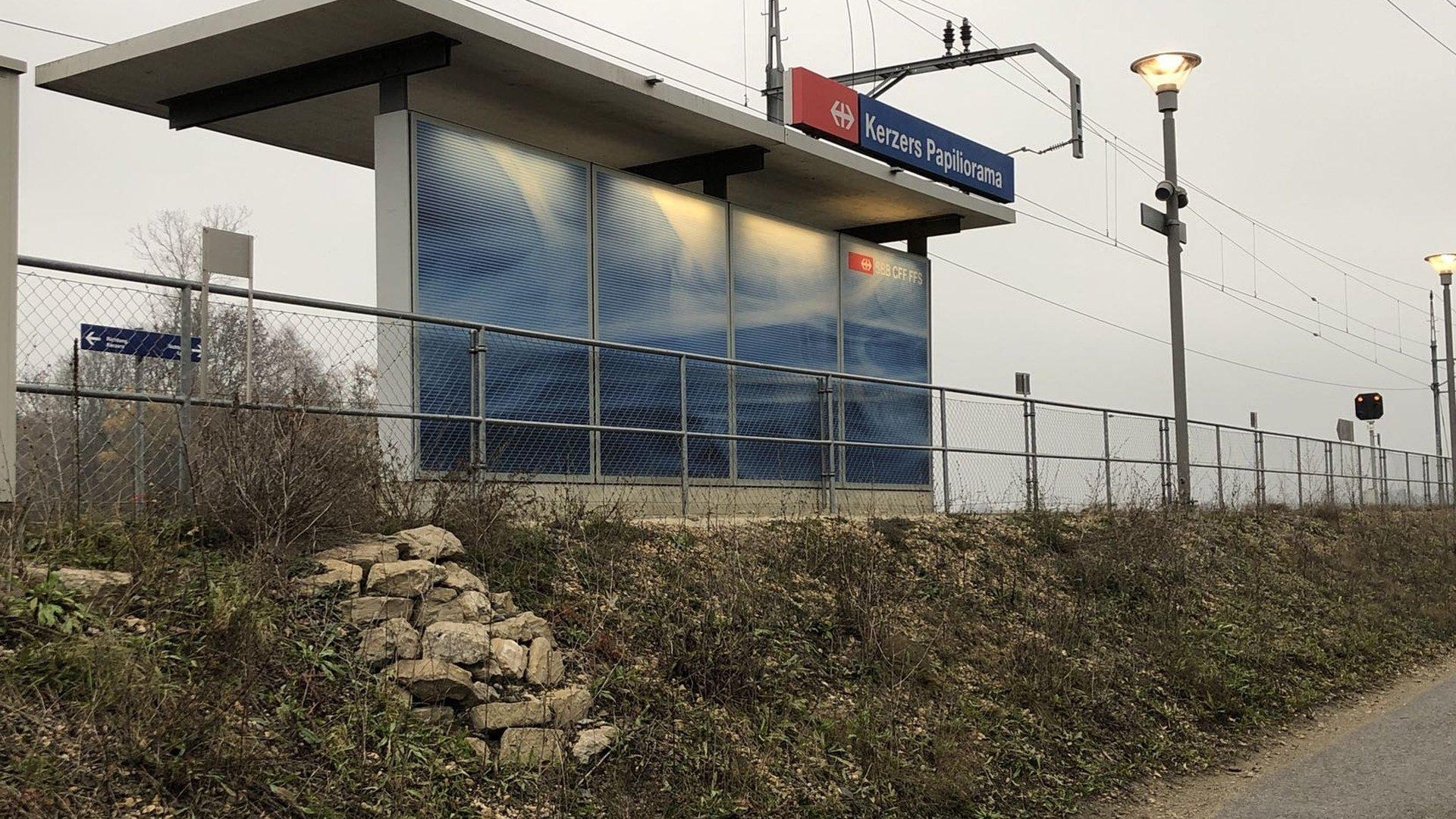
- The station shelter in 2018

General information
- Location: Kerzers; Switzerland
- Coordinates: 46°59′23″N 7°11′57″E
- Elevation: 437 m (1,434 ft)
- Owner: Swiss Federal Railways
- Line: Palézieux–Lyss railway line
- Platforms: 1 side platform
- Tracks: 1
- Train operators: BLS AG

Construction
- Cycle facilities: Yes (29 spaces)
- Accessible: Yes

Other information
- Station code: 8516444 (KZPP)
- Fare zone: 56 (frimobil); 697 (Libero)

History
- Opened: 1 June 2005

Passengers
- 2023: 210 per weekday (BLS)

Services
Preceding station	Bern S-Bahn	Following station
Kerzers Terminus	S35	Fräschels towards Lyss
Location

Kerzers Papiliorama railway station (German: Bahnhof Kerzers Papiliorama) is a railway station in the municipality of Kerzers, in the Swiss canton of Fribourg. It is an intermediate stop on the standard gauge Palézieux–Lyss railway line of Swiss Federal Railways. The station serves the nearby butterfly sanctuary (Papiliorama).

== Services ==
The following services stop at Kerzers Papiliorama:

- Bern S-Bahn S35: hourly service between Kerzers and Lyss.
