= Fräschels =

- Municipality
- Flag Coat of arms
- Location of Fräschels
- Location within Switzerland Location within Canton of Fribourg
- Coordinates: 47°0′N 7°12′E
- Country: Switzerland
- Canton: Fribourg
- District: See

Government
  - Executive: Gemeinderat with 5 members
  - Mayor: Ammann

Area
  - Total: 3.14 km^{2} (1.21 sq mi)
- Elevation: 457 m (1,499 ft)

Population (December 2020)
  - Total: 456
  - Density: 145/km^{2} (376/sq mi)
- Time zone: UTC+01:00 (CET)
  - Summer (DST): UTC+02:00 (CEST)
- Postal code: 3284
- SFOS number: 2258
- ISO 3166 code: CH-FR
- Surrounded by: Kallnach (BE), Kerzers, Niederried bei Kallnach (BE)
- Website: www.fraeschels.ch

Fräschels (German) or Frasses (French: [fʁas], Franco-Provençal: [ˈfʁasɛ]) is a municipality in the district of See in the canton of Fribourg in Switzerland.

== History ==
Aerial view (1954)

Fräschels is first mentioned in 1225 as Frescin. In 1228 it was mentioned as Frasses in French.

== Geography ==
Fräschels has an area, as of 2009, of 3.1 square kilometers (1.2 mi^{2}). Of this area, 2.24 km^{2} (0.86 mi^{2}) or 71.3% is used for agricultural purposes, while 0.54 km^{2} (0.21 mi^{2}) or 17.2% is forested. Of the rest of the land, 0.33 km^{2} (0.13 mi^{2}) or 10.5% is settled (buildings or roads), 0.02 km^{2} (4.9 acres) or 0.6% is either rivers or lakes and 0.01 km^{2} (2.5 acres) or 0.3% is unproductive land.

Of the built up area, housing and buildings made up 6.7% and transportation infrastructure made up 3.2%. Out of the forested land, 15.6% of the total land area is heavily forested and 1.6% is covered with orchards or small clusters of trees. Of the agricultural land, 63.1% is used for growing crops and 5.4% is pastures, while 2.9% is used for orchards or vine crops. All the water in the municipality is flowing water.

The municipality is located in the See/Lac district. It is the northernmost municipality in the canton and is 10 km (6.2 mi) north of Murten on the eastern edge of the Grosses Moos marshlands.

== Coat of arms ==
The blazon of the municipal coat of arms is Argent, a Mile-stone Sable masoned of the field between two Alders Vert all issuant from a base of the last.

== Demographics ==
Fräschels has a population (as of December 2020) of 456. As of 2008, 7.0% of the population are resident foreign nationals. Over the last 10 years (2000–2010) the population has changed at a rate of 1%. Migration accounted for 1.4%, while births and deaths accounted for -1%.

It is a German-speaking municipality in the French-speaking Canton of Fribourg. Most of the population (as of 2000) speaks German (457 or 95.0%) as their first language, Macedonian is the second most common (10 or 2.1%) and French is the third (4 or 0.8%). There are 2 people who speak Italian.

As of 2008, the population was 53.2% male and 46.8% female. The population was made up of 238 Swiss men (48.7% of the population) and 22 (4.5%) non-Swiss men. There were 209 Swiss women (42.7%) and 20 (4.1%) non-Swiss women. Of the population in the municipality, 153 or about 31.8% were born in Fräschels and lived there in 2000. There were 24 or 5.0% who were born in the same canton, while 250 or 52.0% were born somewhere else in Switzerland, and 42 or 8.7% were born outside of Switzerland.

As of 2000, children and teenagers (0–19 years old) make up 28.5% of the population, while adults (20–64 years old) make up 57.8% and seniors (over 64 years old) make up 13.7%.

As of 2000, there were 205 people who were single and never married in the municipality. There were 246 married individuals, 20 widows or widowers and 10 individuals who are divorced.

As of 2000, there were 173 private households in the municipality, and an average of 2.8 persons per household. There were 32 households that consist of only one person and 17 households with five or more people. In 2000, a total of 168 apartments (94.9% of the total) were permanently occupied, while 1 apartment was seasonally occupied and 8 apartments (4.5%) were empty. The vacancy rate for the municipality, in 2010, was 1.59%.

The historical population is given in the following chart:

== Politics ==
In the 2011 federal election the most popular party was the SVP which received 35.1% of the vote. The next two most popular parties were the SPS (14.5%), and the FDP (10.6%) .

The SVP received about the same percentage of the vote as they did in the 2007 Federal election (37.4% in 2007 vs 35.1% in 2011). The SPS moved from third in 2007 (with 14.6%) to second in 2011, the FDP moved from second in 2007 (with 19.1%) to third and the Grünliberale moved from below fourth place in 2007 to fourth. A total of 221 votes were cast in this election, of which 3 or 1.4% were invalid.

== Economy ==
As of 2010, Fräschels had an unemployment rate of 1%. As of 2008, there were 55 people employed in the primary economic sector and about 16 businesses involved in this sector. 14 people were employed in the secondary sector and there were 5 businesses in this sector. 31 people were employed in the tertiary sector, with 9 businesses in this sector. There were 272 residents of the municipality who were employed in some capacity, of which females made up 41.9% of the workforce.

In 2008 the total number of full-time equivalent jobs was 82. The number of jobs in the primary sector was 42, all of which were in agriculture. The number of jobs in the secondary sector was 14 of which 13 or (92.9%) were in manufacturing and 1 was in construction. The number of jobs in the tertiary sector was 26. In the tertiary sector; 6 or 23.1% were in a hotel or restaurant, 4 or 15.4% were in the information industry, 6 or 23.1% were technical professionals or scientists, 2 or 7.7% were in education.

In 2000, there were 19 workers who commuted into the municipality and 178 workers who commuted away. The municipality is a net exporter of workers, with about 9.4 workers leaving the municipality for every one entering. Of the working population, 14.7% used public transportation to get to work, and 55.5% used a private car.

== Religion ==
From the 2000 census, 41 or 8.5% were Roman Catholic, while 344 or 71.5% belonged to the Swiss Reformed Church. Of the rest of the population, there were 16 members of an Orthodox church (or about 3.33% of the population), and there were 30 individuals (or about 6.24% of the population) who belonged to another Christian church. There was 1 individual who was Jewish, and 3 (or about 0.62% of the population) who were Islamic. There were 1 individual who belonged to another church. 57 (or about 11.85% of the population) belonged to no church, are agnostic or atheist, and 3 individuals (or about 0.62% of the population) did not answer the question.

== Weather ==
Fräschels has an average of 124.1 days of rain or snow per year and on average receives 990 mm (39 in) of precipitation. The wettest month is June during which time Fräschels receives an average of 105 mm (4.1 in) of rain or snow. During this month there is precipitation for an average of 11.1 days. The month with the most days of precipitation is May, with an average of 13, but with only 93 mm (3.7 in) of rain or snow. The driest month of the year is February with an average of 66 mm (2.6 in) of precipitation over 9.8 days.

== Education ==
In Fräschels about 179 or (37.2%) of the population have completed non-mandatory upper secondary education, and 77 or (16.0%) have completed additional higher education (either university or a Fachhochschule). Of the 77 who completed tertiary schooling, 77.9% were Swiss men, 16.9% were Swiss women.

The Canton of Fribourg school system provides one year of non-obligatory Kindergarten, followed by six years of Primary school. This is followed by three years of obligatory lower Secondary school where the students are separated according to ability and aptitude. Following the lower Secondary students may attend a three- or four-year optional upper Secondary school. The upper Secondary school is divided into gymnasium (university preparatory) and vocational programs. After they finish the upper Secondary program, students may choose to attend a Tertiary school or continue their apprenticeship.

During the 2010–11 school year, there were a total of 45 students attending 2 classes in Fräschels. A total of 54 students from the municipality attended any school, either in the municipality or outside of it. There were no kindergarten classes in the municipality, but 4 students attended kindergarten in a neighboring municipality. The municipality had one primary class and 36 students. During the same year, there were no lower secondary classes in the municipality, but 20 students attended lower secondary school in a neighboring municipality. There were no upper Secondary classes or vocational classes, but there were 7 upper Secondary students and one upper Secondary vocational student who attended classes in another municipality. The municipality had no non-university Tertiary classes, but there were 2 specialized Tertiary students who attended classes in another municipality.

As of 2000, there were 42 students from Fräschels who attended schools outside the municipality.

== Transportation ==
The municipality has a railway station, Fräschels, on the Palézieux–Lyss line. It has regular service to Kerzers and Lyss.
