= Bargen BE railway station =

Railway station in Bargen, Canton of Bern, Switzerland

Bargen BE
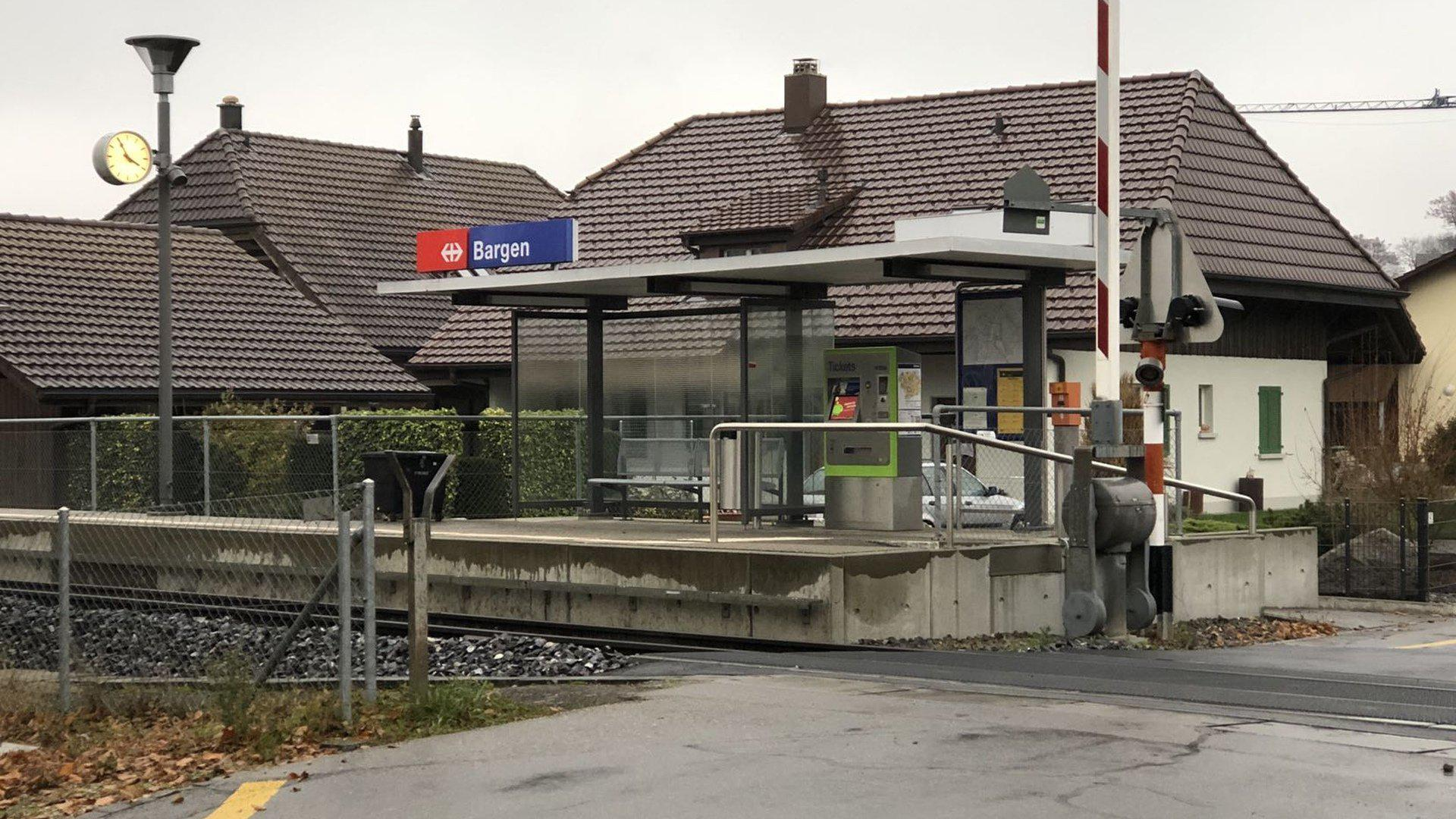
- The station in 2018

General information
- Location: Bargen; Switzerland
- Coordinates: 47°02′25″N 7°15′40″E
- Elevation: 448 m (1,470 ft)
- Owner: Swiss Federal Railways
- Line: Palézieux–Lyss railway line
- Distance: 93.9 km (58.3 mi) from Lausanne
- Platforms: 1 side platform
- Tracks: 1
- Train operators: BLS AG

Construction
- Cycle facilities: Yes (9 spaces)
- Accessible: Yes

Other information
- Station code: 8504403 (BRG)
- Fare zone: 310 (Libero)

Passengers
- 2023: 160 per weekday (BLS)

Services
Preceding station	Bern S-Bahn	Following station
Kallnach towards Kerzers	S35	Aarberg towards Lyss
Location

Bargen BE railway station (German: Bahnhof Bargen BE) is a railway station in the municipality of Bargen, in the Swiss canton of Bern. It is an intermediate stop on the standard gauge Palézieux–Lyss railway line of Swiss Federal Railways.

== Services ==
The following services stop at Bargen BE:

- Bern S-Bahn S35: hourly service between Kerzers and Lyss.
