= Fräschels railway station =

Railway station in Fräschels, Switzerland

Fräschels
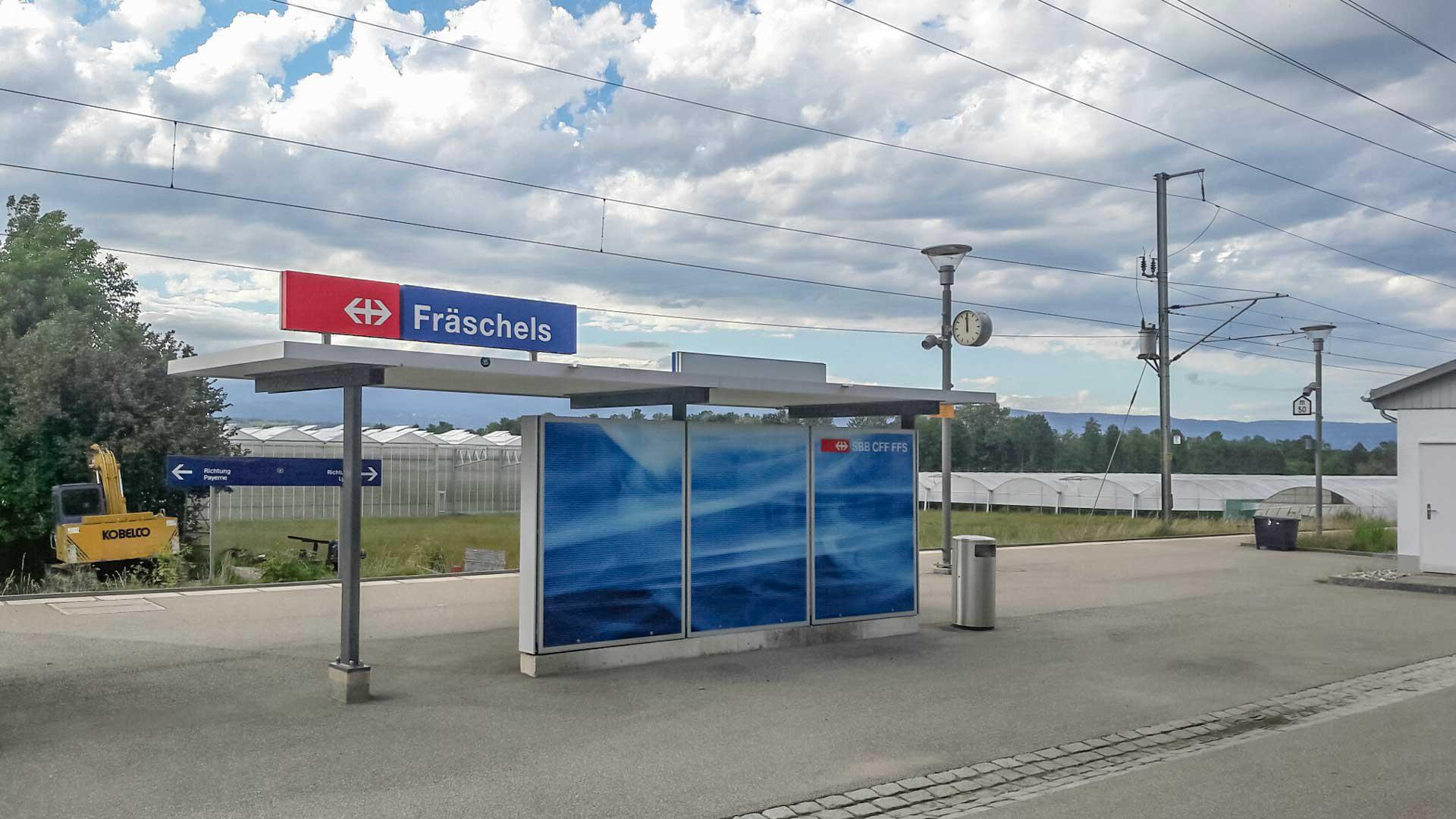
- The station shelter in 2018

General information
- Location: Fräschels; Switzerland
- Coordinates: 46°59′57″N 7°12′22″E
- Elevation: 440 m (1,440 ft)
- Owner: Swiss Federal Railways
- Line: Palézieux–Lyss railway line
- Distance: 87.7 km (54.5 mi) from Lausanne
- Platforms: 1 side platform
- Tracks: 1
- Train operators: BLS AG

Construction
- Parking: Yes (4 spaces)
- Cycle facilities: Yes (9 spaces)
- Accessible: Yes

Other information
- Station code: 8504401 (FRAE)
- Fare zone: 56 (frimobil); 697 (Libero)

Passengers
- 2023: 80 per weekday (BLS)

Services
Preceding station	Bern S-Bahn	Following station
Kerzers Papiliorama towards Kerzers	S35	Kallnach towards Lyss
Location

Fräschels railway station (German: Bahnhof Fräschels) is a railway station in the municipality of Fräschels, in the Swiss canton of Fribourg. It is an intermediate stop on the standard gauge Palézieux–Lyss railway line of Swiss Federal Railways.

== Services ==
The following services stop at Fräschels:

- Bern S-Bahn S35: hourly service between Kerzers and Lyss.
