= Kallnach railway station =

Railway station in Fräschels, Switzerland

Kallnach
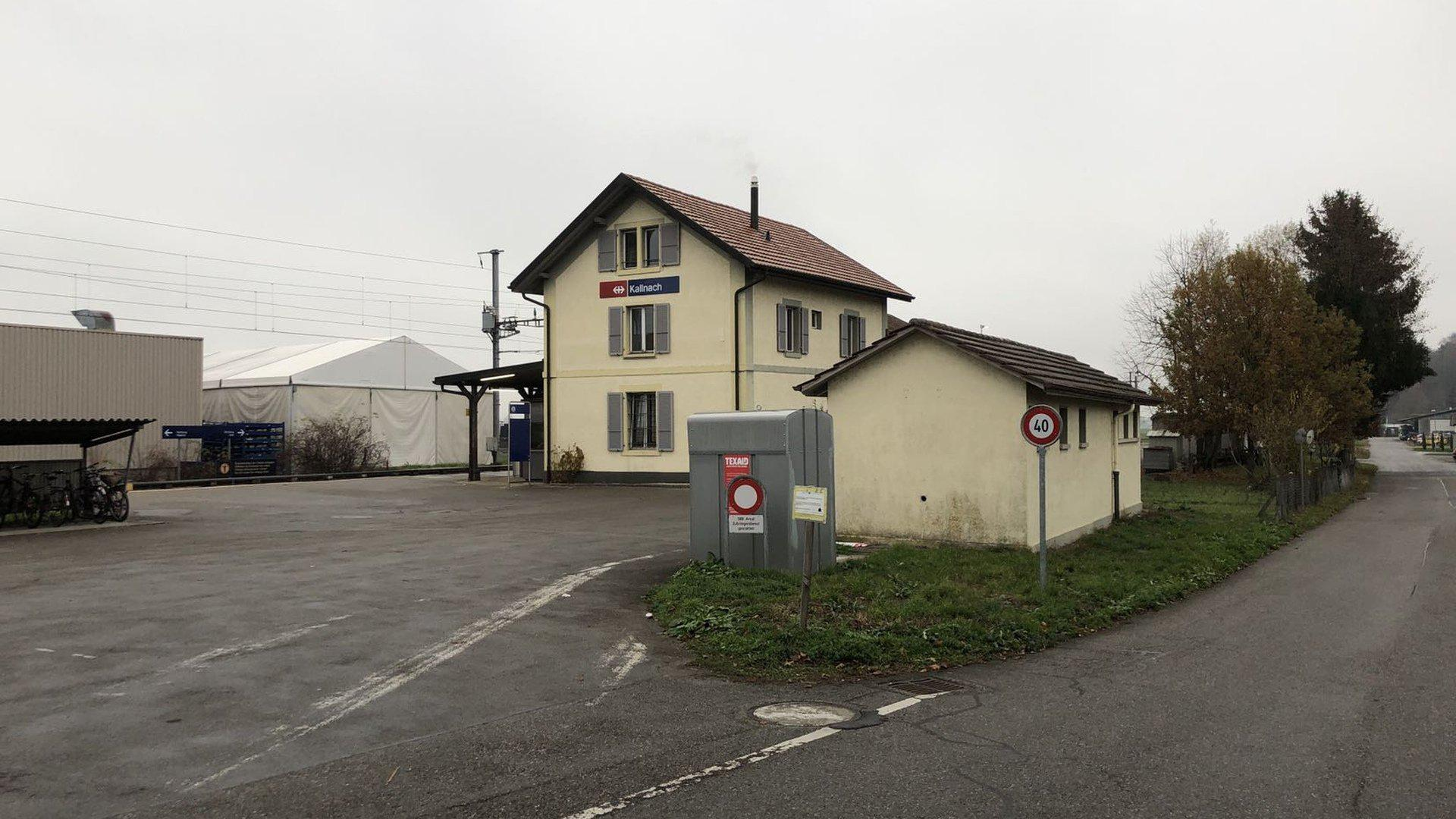
- The station building in 2018

General information
- Location: Kallnach; Switzerland
- Coordinates: 47°01′32″N 7°14′07″E
- Elevation: 444 m (1,457 ft)
- Owner: Swiss Federal Railways
- Line: Palézieux–Lyss railway line
- Distance: 91.4 km (56.8 mi) from Lausanne
- Platforms: 1 side platform
- Tracks: 2
- Train operators: BLS AG

Construction
- Parking: Yes (6 spaces)
- Cycle facilities: Yes (50 spaces)
- Accessible: No

Other information
- Station code: 8504402 (KAL)
- Fare zone: 177 (Libero)

Passengers
- 2023: 310 per weekday (BLS)

Services
Preceding station	Bern S-Bahn	Following station
Fräschels towards Kerzers	S35	Bargen BE towards Lyss
Location

Kallnach railway station (German: Bahnhof Kallnach) is a railway station in the municipality of Kallnach, in the Swiss canton of Bern. It is an intermediate stop on the standard gauge Palézieux–Lyss railway line of Swiss Federal Railways.

== History ==
Between March 2025 and Autumn 2025 the station's side platform will rebuilt and raised to a height of 55 centimetres (22 in) to permit barrier-free boarding. The technical equipment for the platform and tracks will be renewed. The car parking and the bike parking spaces will also be rebuilt.

== Services ==
The following services stop at Kallnach:

- Bern S-Bahn S35: hourly service between Kerzers and Lyss.
