= Bernese State Railway =

The Bernese State Railway (Bernische Staatsbahn, BSB) was a railway company in Switzerland. The BSB was owned by the Canton of Bern and was the first government-owned railway in Switzerland.

== History ==
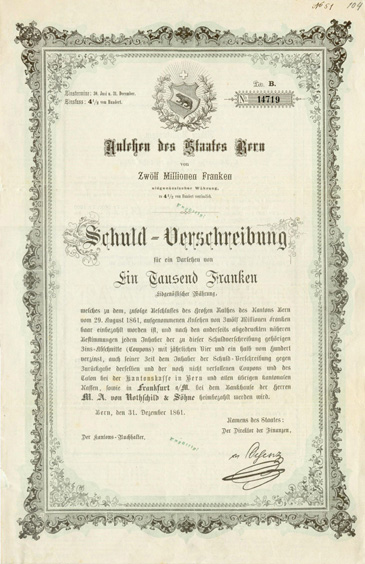
Government bond of the Bernese State Railway

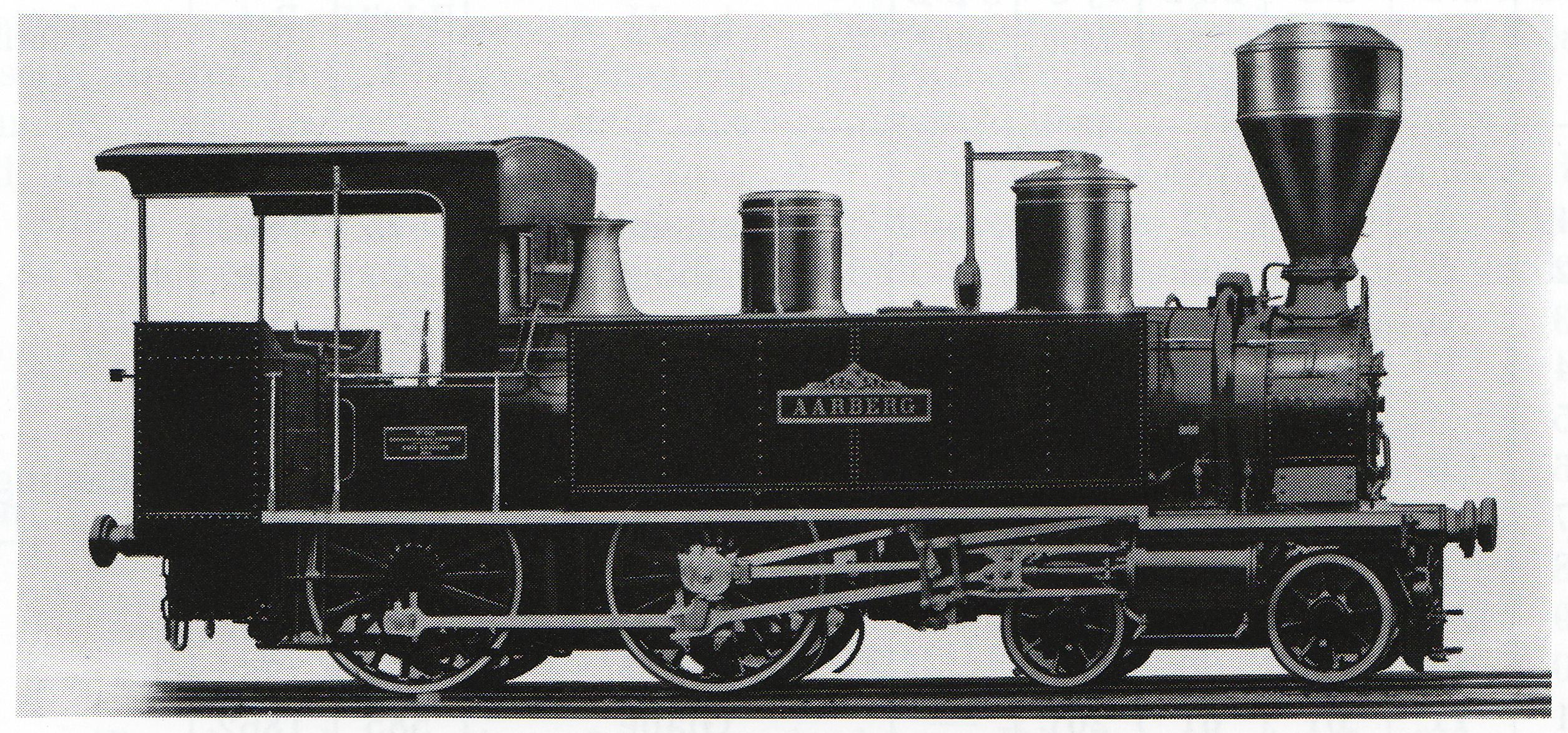
Passenger train locomotive no. 12 Aarberg/Bueren, built by the Maschinenfabrik Esslingen in 1864

The BSB was established in 1861 from the bankrupt estate of the Swiss East–West Railway (Schweizerische Ostwestbahn, OWB), which began the construction of the La Neuveville–Biel/Bienne–Bern–Gümligen–Langnau–Lucerne–Zug–Zürich line despite a lack of funds. Taking into account the subsidies of Swiss francs (CHF) 2 million that had already been transferred to it, the canton of Bern decided to take over the unfinished part of the line within Bern for CHF 7 million.

The rail network of the BSB initially consisted only of the La Neuveville–Biel/Bienne line that was opened by the OWB, which was leased to the Swiss Central Railway (Schweizerische Centralbahn, SCB) in 1864. Until then, the BSB did not have its own rolling stock. The Biel–Zollikofen (–Bern) and (Bern–) Gümligen–Langnau lines were put into operation on 1 June 1864. In order for the BSB to establish its own business, it procured 12 locomotives, 39 passenger cars and 130 freight wagons in 1864.

In 1875, the newly opened Bern-Lucerne Railway (Bern-Luzern-Bahn, BLB) acquired the Gümligen–Langnau branch line for CHF 7.34 million. It was hoped that the establishment of a continuous link to Lucerne would improve the profitability of the line. Due to excessive construction costs, however, the BLB became bankrupt in 1876 and was bought at auction by the canton of Bern for CHF 8.5 million in 1877. At the same time, the BSB was dissolved and the Zollikofen–Biel–La Neuveville section was sold to the Bernese Jura Railway (Chemins de fer du Jura bernois, JB) for shares worth CHF 11.56 million.

Financially, the BSB was quite successful. More than CHF 6.2 million flowed as profits to the state treasury from 1864 to 1877.

== Rolling stock ==
The following is a list of locomotives used at the BSB:

Class	BSB no.	BSB name	BLB no. from 1875	JB no. from 1877	JS no. from 1890	Manufacturer	Build year	Scrapped
from 1873: A from 1874: I from 1887: A2 (from 1902: Ec 2/4)	1	Bund	1	1	1	Esslingen	1863	1895
from 1873: A from 1874: I from 1887: A2 (from 1902: Ec 2/4)	2	Seeland	2	2	2	Esslingen	1863	1895
from 1873: A from 1874: I from 1887: A2 (from 1902: Ec 2/4)	3	Mittelland	3	3	–	Esslingen	1863	1888
from 1873: A from 1874: I from 1887: A2 (from 1902: Ec 2/4)	4	Oberaargau	4	4	–	Esslingen	1863	1889
from 1873: A from 1874: I from 1887: A2 (from 1902: Ec 2/4)	5	Emmenthal	5	5	–	Esslingen	1863	1888
from 1873: A from 1874: I from 1887: A2 (from 1902: Ec 2/4)	6	Jura	6	6	6	Esslingen	1864	1890
from 1873: A from 1874: I from 1887: A2 (from 1902: Ec 2/4)	7	Oberland	7	7	–	Esslingen	1864	1888
from 1873: A from 1874: I from 1887: A2 (from 1902: Ec 2/4)	8	Bern	8	8	–	Esslingen	1864	1889
from 1873: A from 1874: I from 1887: A2 (from 1902: Ec 2/4)	9	Biel/Nidau	9	9	9	Esslingen	1864	1896
from 1873: A from 1874: I from 1887: A2 (from 1902: Ec 2/4)	10	Neuenstadt	10	10	–	Esslingen	1864	1895
from 1873: A from 1874: I from 1887: A2 (from 1902: Ec 2/4)	11	Langnau	11	11	–	Esslingen	1864	1888
from 1873: A from 1874: I from 1887: A2 (from 1902: Ec 2/4)	12	Aarberg/Bueren	12	12	–	Esslingen	1864	1896
