= Brügg BE railway station =

Railway station in Brügg BE, Switzerland

Brügg BE
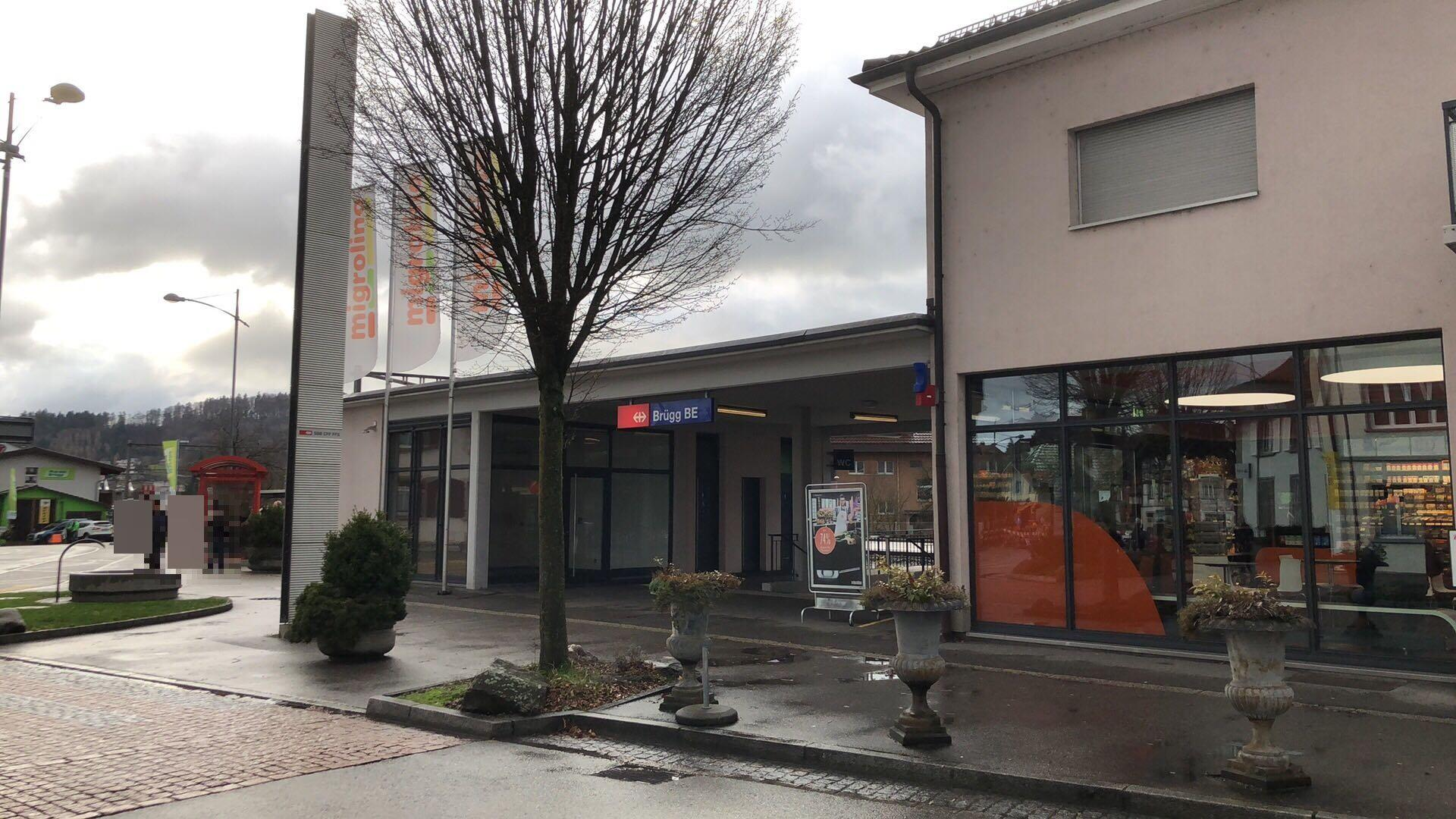
- The station building in 2018

General information
- Location: Brügg BE; Switzerland
- Coordinates: 47°07′25″N 7°16′42″E
- Elevation: 436 m (1,430 ft)
- Owner: Swiss Federal Railways
- Line: Biel/Bienne–Bern line
- Platforms: 2 (1 island platform)
- Tracks: 2
- Train operators: BLS AG
- Connections: Verkehrsbetriebe Biel/Transports publics biennois bus line; Aare Seeland mobil bus line

Construction
- Parking: Yes (21 spaces)
- Cycle facilities: Yes (79 spaces)
- Accessible: Yes

Other information
- Station code: 8504416 (BGG)
- Fare zone: 301 (Libero)

Passengers
- 2023: 1'100 per weekday (BLS)

Services
Preceding station	Bern S-Bahn	Following station
Biel/Bienne Terminus	S3	Studen BE towards Belp
Location

Brügg BE railway station (German: Bahnhof Brügg BE) is a railway station in the municipality of Brügg BE, in the Swiss canton of Bern. It is an intermediate stop on the standard gauge Biel/Bienne–Bern line of Swiss Federal Railways.

== Services ==
As of the December 2024 timetable change, the following services stop at Brügg BE:

- Bern S-Bahn S3: half-hourly service between Biel/Bienne and Belp.
