= Lyss Grien railway station =

Railway station in Lyss, Switzerland

Lyss Grien
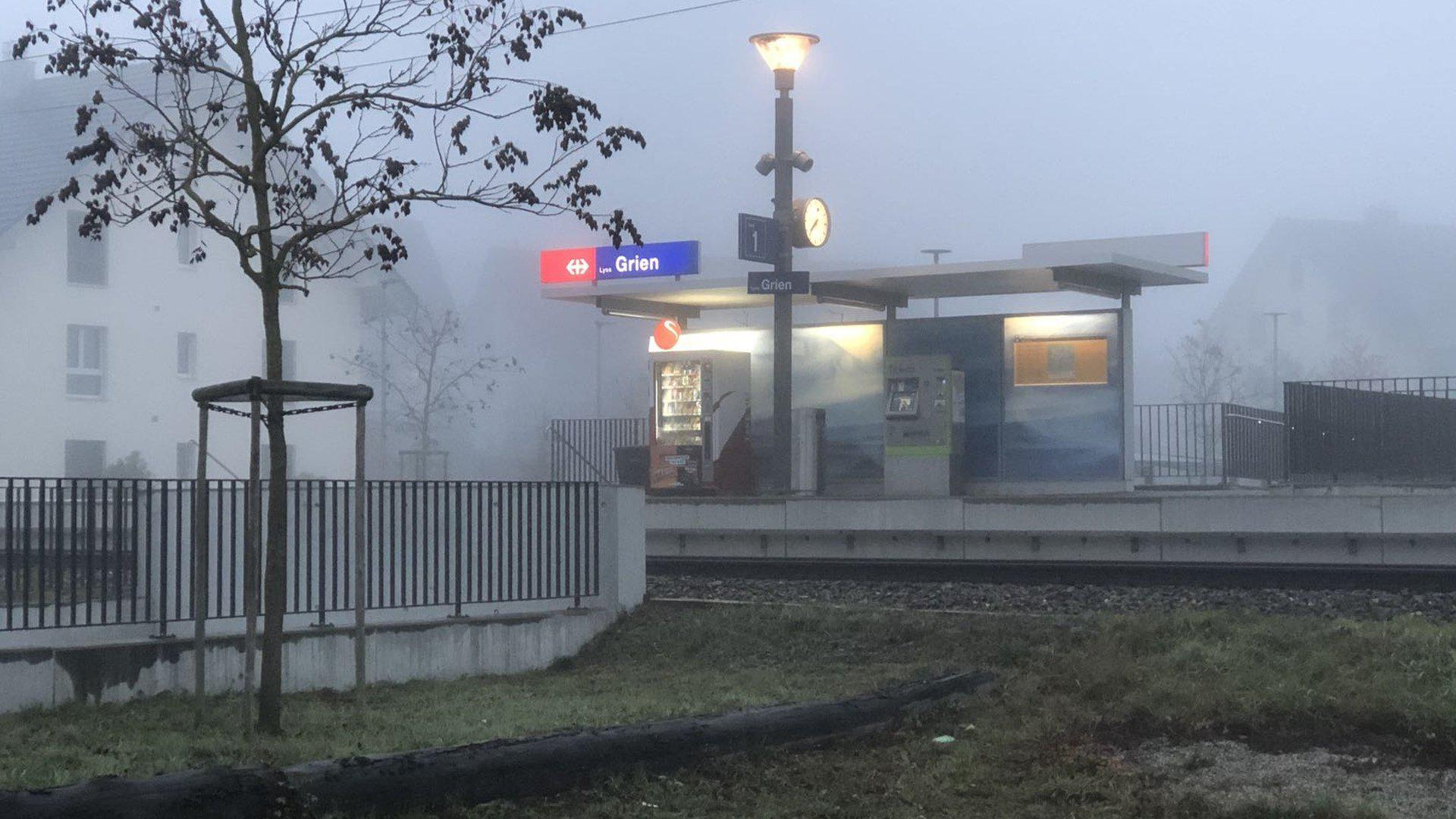
- The station shelter in 2018

General information
- Location: Lyss; Switzerland
- Coordinates: 47°04′22″N 7°17′47″E
- Elevation: 442 m (1,450 ft)
- Owner: Swiss Federal Railways
- Line: Palézieux–Lyss railway line
- Platforms: 1 side platform
- Tracks: 1
- Train operators: BLS AG

Construction
- Cycle facilities: Yes (32 spaces)
- Accessible: Yes

Other information
- Station code: 8518749 (LYGR)
- Fare zone: 310 and 311 (Libero)

History
- Opened: 15 December 2013

Passengers
- 2023: 220 per weekday (BLS)

Services
Preceding station	Bern S-Bahn	Following station
Aarberg towards Kerzers	S35	Lyss Terminus
Location

Lyss Grien railway station (German: Bahnhof Lyss Grien) is a railway station in the municipality of Lyss, in the Swiss canton of Bern. It is an intermediate stop on the standard gauge Palézieux–Lyss railway line of Swiss Federal Railways.

== Services ==
The following services stop at Lyss Grien:

- Bern S-Bahn S35: hourly service between Kerzers and Lyss.
