= Lyss–Solothurn railway line =

Lyss–Solothurn
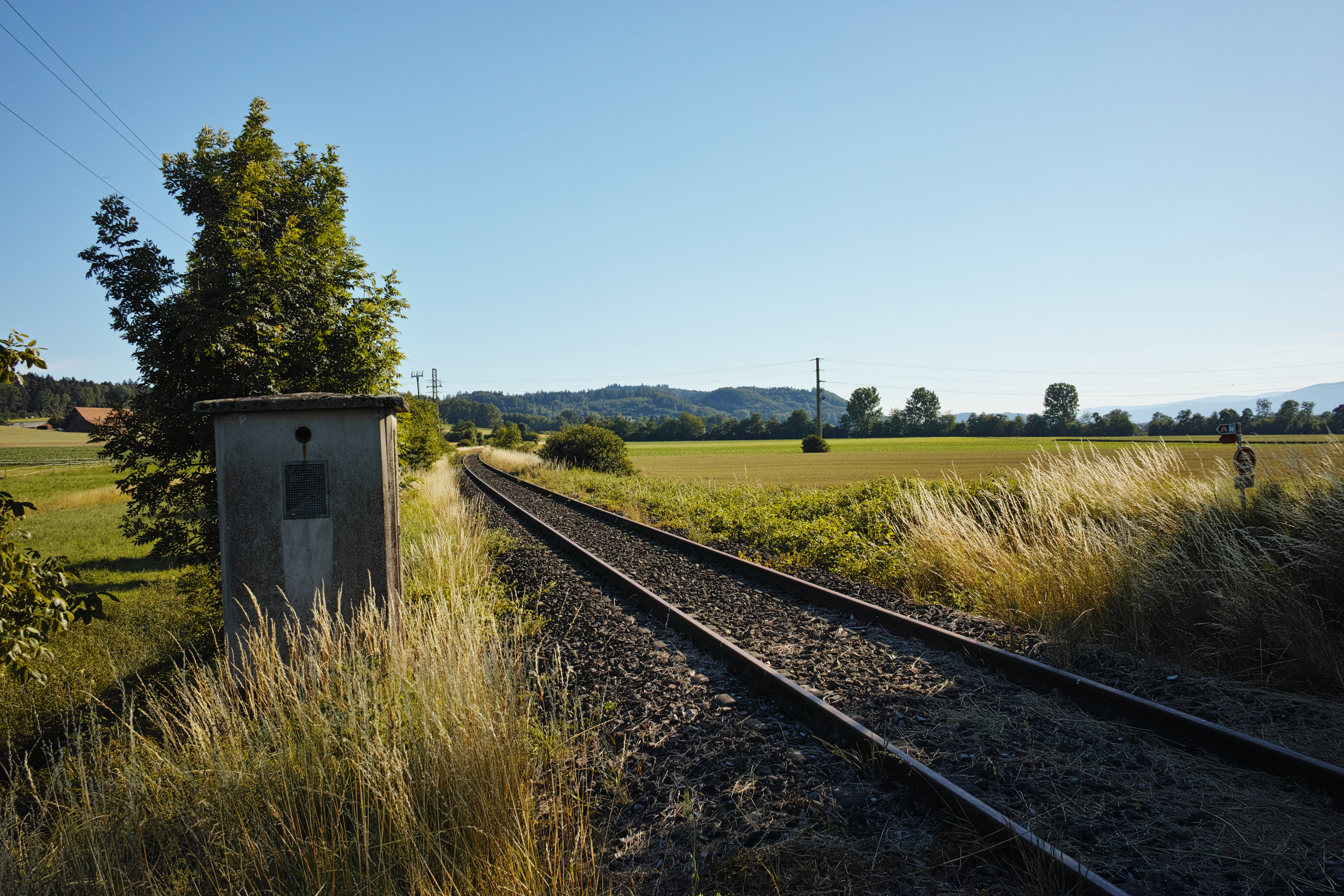
- Lyss-Solothurn railway line between Rüti bei Büren and Büren an der Aare

Overview
- Owner: Swiss Federal Railways
- Line number: 415
- Termini: Lyss; Solothurn

Service
- Operator(s): BLS AG

History
- Opened: 1864
- Completed: 1876
- 1994: Cease of passenger operations between Büren and Solothurn

Technical
- Line length: 24.3 km (15.1 mi)
- Track gauge: 1,435 mm (4 ft 8 1/2 in) standard gauge
- Electrification: 15 kV/16.7 Hz AC overhead catenary

The Lyss–Solothurn railway line is a standard gauge railway line in cantons of Bern and Solothurn, Switzerland. Rail traffic has been suspended on the Büren an der Aare – Solothurn section. The infrastructure belongs to SBB, while BLS is responsible for passenger services.

== History ==
=== Opening ===
The first section of the line, between Lyss and Busswil, was opened in 1864 when the Bernese State Railway handed it over to traffic as part of today's Biel/Bienne–Bern railway, which at the time of its opening was part of the La Neuveville-Biel-Bern-Langnau state main line. At the end of 1876, the Busswil-Solothurn line went into operation at the same time as the Gäubahn from Olten to Solothurn.

=== Nationalisation and 1929 accident ===
The line came into the ownership of SBB in 1902, but since 2004, BLS has been responsible for transport on the line following a major swap between regional and long-distance transport in the Bern area.

On 9 September 1929, an empty extra military train collided with a passenger train near Lüsslingen due to a misunderstanding about the location of the train crossing, injuring around 70 people.

=== Decommissioning of the Büren–Solothurn section ===
In 1994, passenger service on the Büren an der Aare-Solothurn section ceased and converted to bus operation because the frequency of use was unsatisfactory in the eyes of the SBB. The overhead line has been dismantled, but the tracks are completely intact with one short exception at Büren station. The line is still used from Solothurn to Arch for connecting journeys, but due to the installation of two buffer stops and the short section of track missing at Büren station, continuous operation is no longer possible. The section of track was officially closed by the federal government in 2003. The buffer stop in Büren, which marks the end of the line from the direction of Lyss, was also built in the same year. Since then, the Verein Dampfbahn Bern has organised special public trips with steam trains on the disused section from Büren to Solothurn. However, an inspection of the main road 22 subway at the entrance to the village of Büren revealed that the railway bridge was in poor condition, so this has no longer been possible since 2016: SBB is not interested in renovating it and the Verein Dampfbahn Bern does not have the necessary funds to cover the costs of several 100,000 francs.

While the canton of Solothurn welcomed the changeover because of the improved accessibility of the buses from the villages, the canton of Bern and the Swiss Association for Transport lodged complaints against the initially temporary changeover. The proposal drawn up by both institutions was to extend the Oensingen-Balsthal railway line from Oensingen via the Gäubahn via Solothurn and Büren to Lyss.

SBB wants to remove the tracks on the Büren–Rüti section by 2027 and use the free space for a biodiversity project and a cycle path.

== Operation ==
At the time of the opening, the trains were linked through to the Solothurn-Herzogenbuchsee railway line. Now that this has been converted into the Solothurn-Wanzwil extension line without regional services, the train service is no longer possible. Instead, BLS runs hourly regional trains between Büren and Lyss, with additional trains at peak hours. In Lyss, there is a connection to the InterRegio 65 trains to Biel and Berne as well as to the S35 to Kerzers.
