= Büren an der Aare railway station =

Railway station in Büren an der Aare, Switzerland

Büren an der Aare
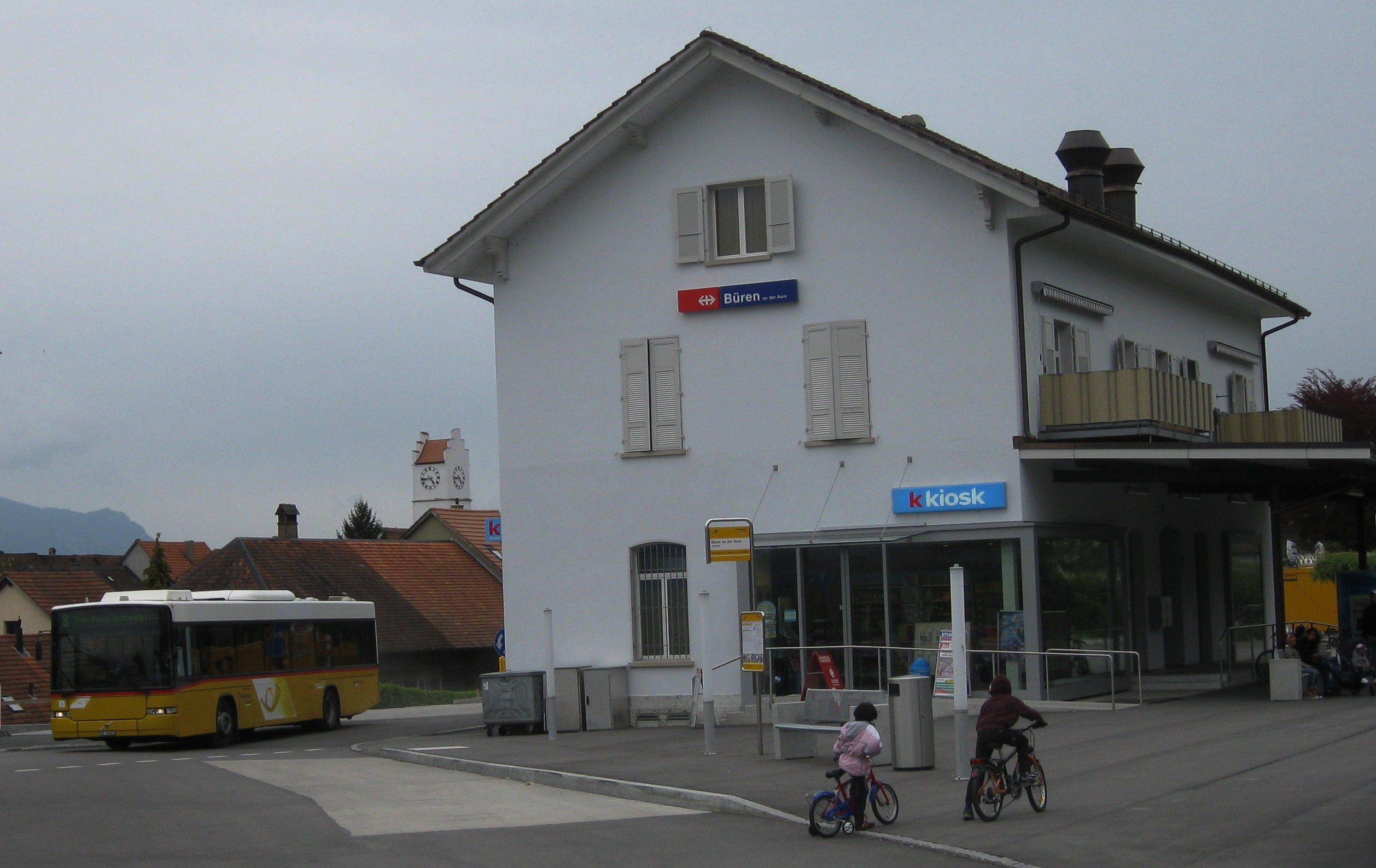
- The station building in 2010

General information
- Location: Büren an der Aare; Switzerland
- Coordinates: 47°08′17″N 7°22′16″E
- Elevation: 443 m (1,453 ft)
- Owner: Swiss Federal Railways
- Line: Lyss–Solothurn line
- Platforms: 1 side platform
- Tracks: 1
- Train operators: BLS AG
- Connections: RBS buses

Construction
- Parking: Yes (49 spaces)
- Cycle facilities: Yes (57 spaces)
- Accessible: Yes

Other information
- Station code: 8500221 (BUER)
- Fare zone: 229 (Libero)

Passengers
- 2023: 1'100 per weekday (BLS)

Services
Preceding station	Bern S-Bahn	Following station
Terminus	S36	Dotzigen towards Lyss
Location

Büren an der Aare railway station (German: Bahnhof Büren an der Aare) is a railway station in the municipality of Büren an der Aare, in the Swiss canton of Bern. It is the northern terminus of the standard gauge Lyss–Solothurn line of Swiss Federal Railways. The line formerly continued northeast to Solothurn.

== Services ==
As of the December 2024 timetable change, the following services stop at Büren an der Aare:

- Bern S-Bahn S36: half-hourly or hourly service to Lyss.
