= Lyss =

- Municipality
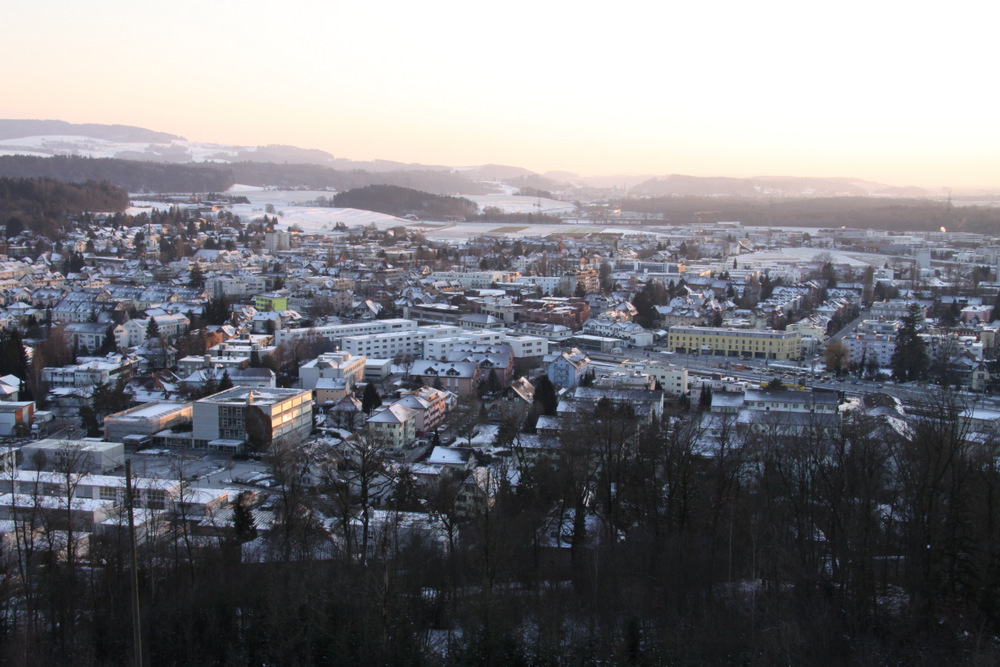
- Winter in Lyss

- Flag Coat of arms
- Location of Lyss
- Location within Switzerland Location within Canton of Bern
- Coordinates: 47°4′N 7°18′E
- Country: Switzerland
- Canton: Bern
- District: Seeland

Government
  - Executive: Gemeinderat with 5 members
  - Mayor: Gemeindepräsident; Stefan Nobs FDP/PRD (as of January 2022)
  - Parliament: Grosser Gemeinderat with 40 members

Area
  - Total: 11.76 km^{2} (4.54 sq mi)
- Elevation: 444 m (1,457 ft)

Population (2018-12-31)
  - Total: 13'918
  - Density: 1.1/km^{2} (2.9/sq mi)
- Time zone: UTC+01:00 (CET)
  - Summer (DST): UTC+02:00 (CEST)
- Postal code: 3250
- SFOS number: 306
- ISO 3166 code: CH-BE
- Surrounded by: Aarberg, Büetigen, Busswil bei Büren, Diessbach bei Büren, Grossaffoltern, Kappelen, Seedorf, Worben
- Twin towns: Monopoli (Italy)
- Website: https://www.lyss.ch

Lyss (German pronunciation: [ˈliːs]) is a municipality in the Seeland administrative district in the canton of Bern in Switzerland. On 1 January 2011, the former municipality of Busswil bei Büren was merged with Lyss.

== History ==
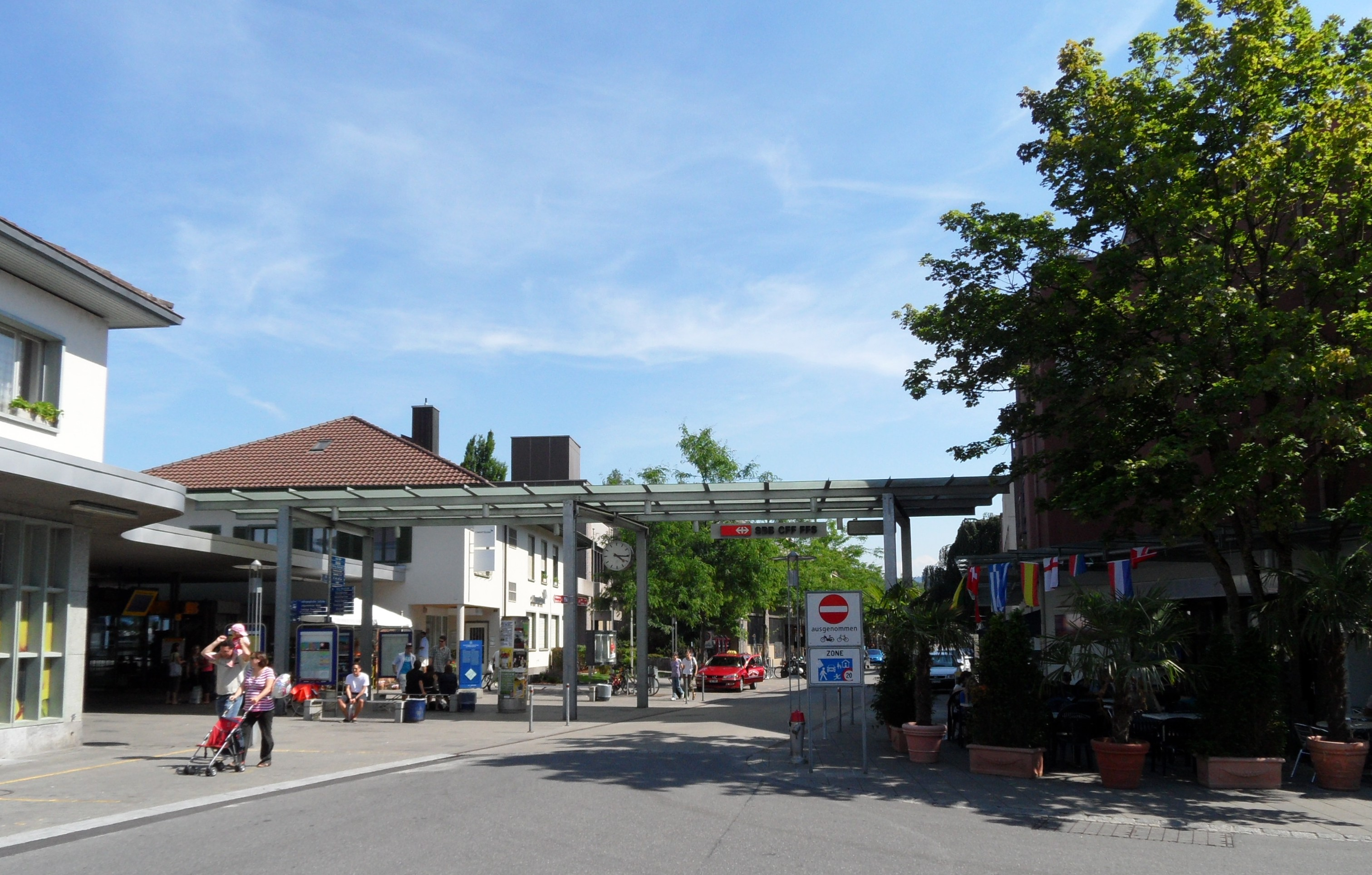
Lyss train station. The first railroad in Lyss in 1864 allowed the town to grow rapidly.

Lyss is first mentioned in 1009 as Lissa.

The oldest traces of humans in Lyss include neolithic, Bronze Age and Hallstatt culture items scattered around the municipality. One of the best preserved items is a 6th-century BC Etruscan bronze statue. Roman era bricks have been found in Kirchhübeli along with early medieval and medieval tombs and the remains of a Carolingian church. A number of graves dating from the 7th Century were discovered at Sonnhalde-Kreuzhöhe.

The Ministerialis (unfree knights in the service of a feudal overlord) family of Lyss is first mentioned in 1185-87 under the Counts of Neuchâtel-Aarberg. In 1367, Lyss, along with the rest of the land around Aarberg, was transferred to the Counts of Neuchâtel-Nidau. About ten years later, around 1377-79 it was transferred again to the City of Bern and became part of the Bernese bailiwick of Aarberg. While Bern owned the village of Lyss, a number of nobles and monasteries owned property, farms or rights in the village and surroundings.

Until the Reformation, Lyss had two parish churches. The church of St. John the Evangelist was built in the 7th or 8th century. Around 1246 it was replaced with a new church, which was partially renovated in the 15th century. It became the center of an important deanery in the second half of the 14th century. After the Reformation it was the only church in Lyss until the current Reformed church was built in 1934–35. The other church St. Mary's Church at Kirchhübeli which was built on the foundations of a Carolingian church. In the 15th century the church began to fall into disrepair, and during the Reformation it was abandoned and demolished in 1533.

For centuries, the meandering Aare and Lyssbach rivers flooded Lyss repeatedly. Over the centuries several dams and levees were built to protect the village. Starting in the 17th century a number of water powered mills, including an oil mill, sawmills, fulling mills and dyeing factories, were built along the river. The first Jura water correction (1868–91) diverted the Aare river into Lake Biel. This, together with the Lyssbach correction (1911–16) opened up extensive farm land along the old river.

The population of Lyss was always greater than in the nearby political and administrative center of Aarberg. However, because of Aarberg's central location and convenient roads Lyss remained a quiet, isolated town. The arrival of the railroad from Bern to Biel in 1864 and the Jura water correction led to extensive population growth. In 1876, another railway line from Lausanne to Solothurn was built through Lyss. This made the town a rail hub. Built in 1983-86 the Bern-Biel/Bienne highway passed through Lyss and brought increased traffic.

In 1866 the Käserei- und Kreditgesellschaft Lyss (Dairy and Credit Society of Lyss) was founded as a bank to help farmers. By 1880 it had grown into a savings and loan bank which helped fund the expansion of Lyss. With the new rail links, factories began to settle in the town. By 1900 there were factories manufacturing watches, cement products, biscuits, watch crystals, fittings, bricks, cloth and steel. Heavy machinery factories moved in by 1940. The town expanded in 1956 and again in 1979 as businesses and residents moved into Lyss. In 2005 there were 6,035 jobs in a town of about 10,000 people.

== Geography ==
Aerial view by Walter Mittelholzer (1922)

Lyss has an area of 14.83 km^{2} (5.73 sq mi). Of this area, 3.56 km^{2} (1.37 mi^{2}) or 30.2% is used for agricultural purposes, while 3.98 km^{2} (1.54 mi^{2}) or 33.8% is forested. Of the rest of the land, 4.19 km^{2} (1.62 mi^{2}) or 35.6% is settled (buildings or roads), 0.05 km^{2} (12 acres) or 0.4% is either rivers or lakes.

Of the built up area, industrial buildings made up 6.4% of the total area while housing and buildings made up 14.0% and transportation infrastructure made up 9.6%. Power and water infrastructure as well as other special developed areas made up 2.5% of the area while parks, green belts and sports fields made up 3.1%. Out of the forested land, all of the forested land area is covered with heavy forests. Of the agricultural land, 21.5% is used for growing crops and 7.2% is pastures, while 1.5% is used for orchards or vine crops. All the water in the municipality is flowing water.

The municipality is an administrative and economic center for the surrounding region. Lyss is located at the mouth of the Lyssbach valley on the former right bank of the Aare river. It consists of the village of Lyss and village sections of Hardern and Eigenacker. Until 1876 it included the settlement of Werdthof, which is now part of Kappelen.

Lyss lies on the eastern edge of a wide valley that extends southwest to Lake Murten. West of this valley lie Lake Neuchâtel and Lake Biel, and beyond that the Jura Mountains.

The valley is flat and was subject to flooding until 1878, when a major hydraulic engineering project changed the courses of the Aare and the Zihl and lowered the level of the three lakes by 2.5 meters (8.2 ft). In addition, water from the Aare, the Broye, the Zihl, and the Schüss was diverted into the Nidau-Büren Canal and the Hagneck Canal.

== Coat of arms ==
The blazon of the municipal coat of arms is Azure a Fleur-de-lys Argent ringed Or on a Mount of 3 Coupeaux Vert.

== Demographics ==
Lyss has a population (as of December 2020) of 15,763. As of 2010, 16.0% of the population are resident foreign nationals. Over the last 10 years (2000–2010) the population has changed at a rate of 9.4%. Migration accounted for 7.9%, while births and deaths accounted for 1.7%.

Most of the population (as of 2000) speaks German (9,072 or 85.1%) as their first language, Italian is the second most common (356 or 3.3%) and Spanish is the third (271 or 2.5%). There are 196 people who speak French and 6 people who speak Romansh.

As of 2008, the population was 49.0% male and 51.0% female. The population was made up of 4,803 Swiss men (40.6% of the population) and 992 (8.4%) non-Swiss men. There were 5,131 Swiss women (43.4%) and 89 (0.8%) non-Swiss women. Of the population in the municipality, 2,676 or about 25.1% were born in Lyss and lived there in 2000. There were 4,146 or 38.9% who were born in the same canton, while 1,642 or 15.4% were born somewhere else in Switzerland, and 1,865 or 17.5% were born outside of Switzerland.

As of 2000, children and teenagers (0–19 years old) make up 24.3% of the population, while adults (20–64 years old) make up 63.7% and seniors (over 64 years old) make up 12%.

As of 2000, there were 4,434 people who were single and never married in the municipality. There were 5,101 married individuals, 510 widows or widowers and 614 individuals who are divorced.

As of 2000, there were 5,367 private households in the municipality, and an average of 2.3 persons per household. There were 1,511 households that consist of only one person and 220 households with five or more people. In 2000, a total of 4,533 apartments (93.3% of the total) were permanently occupied, while 205 apartments (4.2%) were seasonally occupied and 123 apartments (2.5%) were empty. As of 2009, the construction rate of new housing units was 13.6 new units per 1000 residents.

As of 2003 the average price to rent an average apartment in Lyss was 973.41 Swiss francs (CHF) per month (US$780, £440, €620 approx. exchange rate from 2003). The average rate for a one-room apartment was 559.24 CHF (US$450, £250, €360), a two-room apartment was about 723.26 CHF (US$580, £330, €460), a three-room apartment was about 838.08 CHF (US$670, £380, €540) and a six or more room apartment cost an average of 1596.12 CHF (US$1280, £720, €1020).

The average apartment price in Lyss was 87.2% of the national average of 1116 CHF. The vacancy rate for the municipality, in 2010, was 1.44%.

The historical population is given in the following chart:

== Twin Town ==
Lyss is twinned with:

- Monopoli, Italy.

== Politics ==
In the 2007 federal election the most popular party was the SVP which received 28.51% of the vote. The next three most popular parties were the SPS (23.05%), the FDP (20.5%) and the EVP Party (9.24%). In the federal election, a total of 3,135 votes were cast, and the voter turnout was 40.5%.

Lyss is governed by the Gemeinderat, an executive branch with 5 members, one of them elected mayor (Gemeindepräsident). The parliament has 47 members and is called Grosser Gemeinderat. The last elections were held in 2009 with the next elections scheduled to be in 2013.

The 47 members of the legislative municipal council belong to 8 different political parties, the strongest being the FDP with 11 seats followed by the SVP with 10 and the SPS with 9 seats.

The executive municipal council is made up of five members of three different political parties. The FDP and the SPS hold two seats each, the SVP holds one seat. The mayor Andreas Hegg is a member of the FDP.

== Economy ==
As of 2010, Lyss had an unemployment rate of 2.5%. As of 2008, there were 54 people employed in the primary economic sector and about 20 businesses involved in this sector. 3,194 people were employed in the secondary sector and there were 153 businesses in this sector. 3,761 people were employed in the tertiary sector, with 505 businesses in this sector.

In 2008 the total number of full-time equivalent jobs was 5,762. The number of jobs in the primary sector was 28, of which 22 were in agriculture and 6 were in forestry or lumber production. The number of jobs in the secondary sector was 2,905 of which 2,228 or (76.7%) were in manufacturing, 30 or (1.0%) were in mining and 567 (19.5%) were in construction. The number of jobs in the tertiary sector was 2,829. In the tertiary sector; 948 or 33.5% were in wholesale or retail sales or the repair of motor vehicles, 145 or 5.1% were in the movement and storage of goods, 181 or 6.4% were in a hotel or restaurant, 108 or 3.8% were in the information industry, 159 or 5.6% were the insurance or financial industry, 531 or 18.8% were technical professionals or scientists, 177 or 6.3% were in education and 207 or 7.3% were in health care.

In 2000, there were 4,242 workers who commuted into the municipality and 3,312 workers who commuted away. The municipality is a net importer of workers, with about 1.3 workers entering the municipality for every one leaving. Of the working population, 21.1% used public transportation to get to work, and 48.7% used a private car.

== Religion ==
From the 2000 census, 2,082 or 19.5% were Roman Catholic, while 6,580 or 61.7% belonged to the Swiss Reformed Church. Of the rest of the population, there were 116 members of an Orthodox church (or about 1.09% of the population), there were 12 individuals (or about 0.11% of the population) who belonged to the Christian Catholic Church, and there were 476 individuals (or about 4.47% of the population) who belonged to another Christian church. There was 1 individual who was Jewish, and 404 (or about 3.79% of the population) who were Islamic. There were 35 individuals who were Buddhist, 147 individuals who were Hindu and 7 individuals who belonged to another church. 751 (or about 7.05% of the population) belonged to no church, are agnostic or atheist, and 281 individuals (or about 2.64% of the population) did not answer the question.

== Education ==
In Lyss about 4,289 or (40.2%) of the population have completed non-mandatory upper secondary education, and 1,196 or (11.2%) have completed additional higher education (either university or a Fachhochschule). Of the 1,196 who completed tertiary schooling, 72.1% were Swiss men, 18.9% were Swiss women, 5.4% were non-Swiss men and 3.6% were non-Swiss women.

The Canton of Bern school system provides two years of obligatory Kindergarten, followed by six years of Primary school. This is followed by three years of obligatory lower Secondary school where the students are separated according to ability and aptitude. Following the lower Secondary students may attend additional schooling or they may enter an apprenticeship.

During the 2018–19 school year, there were a total of 1,640 students attending classes in Lyss. There were 269 kindergarten students in the municipality. Of the kindergarten students, 21.2% were permanent or temporary residents of Switzerland (not citizens) and 28.6% have a different mother language than the classroom language. The municipality had 857 primary students of which, 23.1% were not citizens and 28.8% have a different mother language. During the same year, there were 419lower secondary students of which 21.0% were not citizens and 19.1% have a different mother language than the classroom language. The remaining 95 attended special classes. As of 2000, there were 166 students in Lyss who came from another municipality, while 251 residents attended schools outside the municipality.

Lyss is home to the Gemeindebibliothek Lyss (municipal library of Lyss). The library has (as of 2008) 22,002 books or other media. It was open a total of 224 days with average of 20 hours per week during that year.

== Transportation ==
The municipality has three railway stations: Lyss, Lyss Grien, and Busswil BE. Between them there is regular service to Bern, Belp, Biel/Bienne, Büren an der Aare, and Kerzers.

== Notable people ==
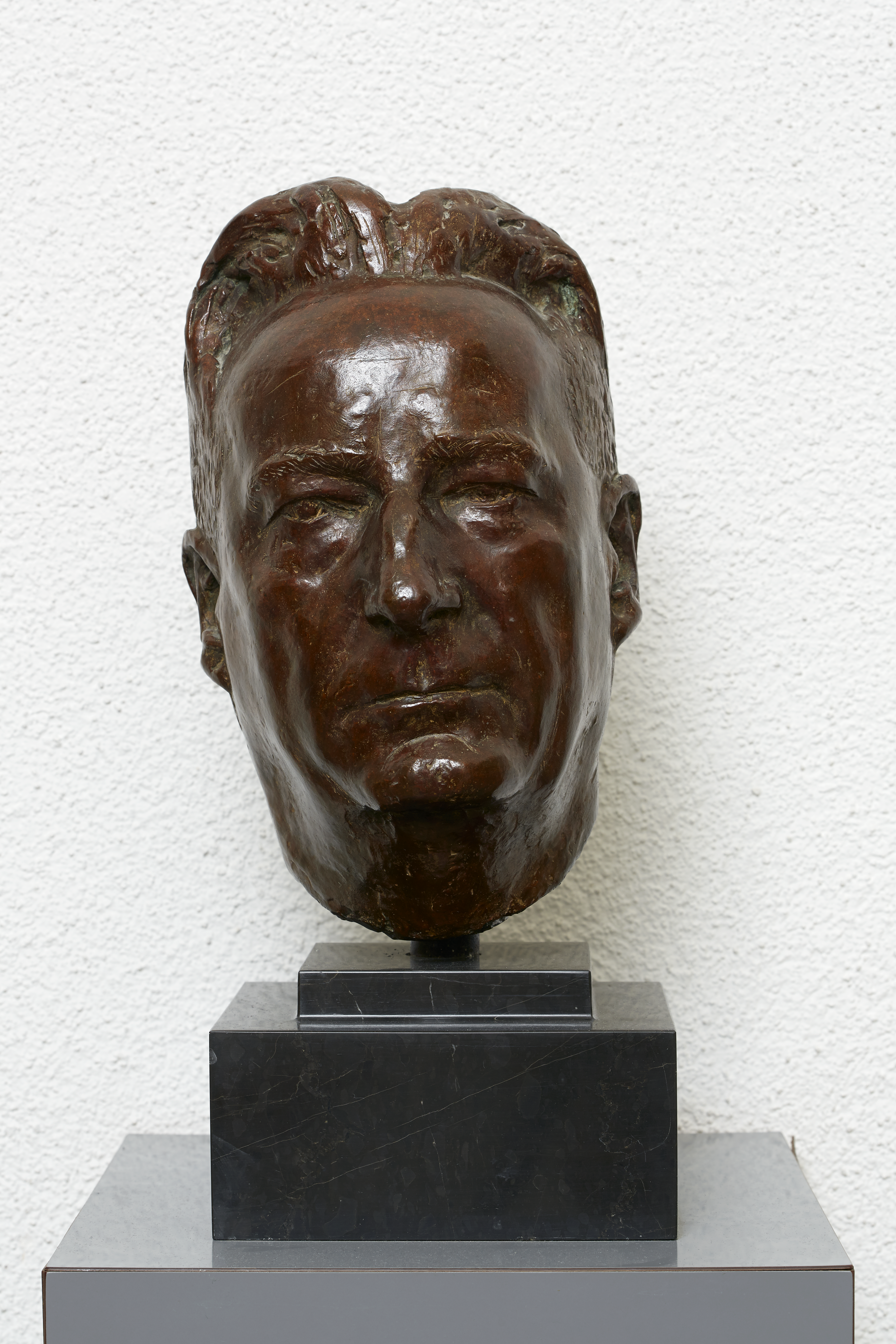
Ernst Gäumann

- Ernst Albert Gäumann (1893 in Lyss – 1963) a Swiss botanist and mycologist
- Werner Zimmermann (born 1915) a retired Swiss slalom and sprint canoeist, competed in the 1936 Summer Olympics
- Margrit von Dach (born 1946 in Lyss) is a Swiss author and translator
- Paolo Collaviti (born 1978 in Lyss) a Swiss football player, currently plays for BSC Young Boys
- Junior Strous (born 1986) a Dutch racing driver and racing team owner, lives in Lyss
