= Lyss railway station =

Railway station in Lyss, Switzerland

Lyss
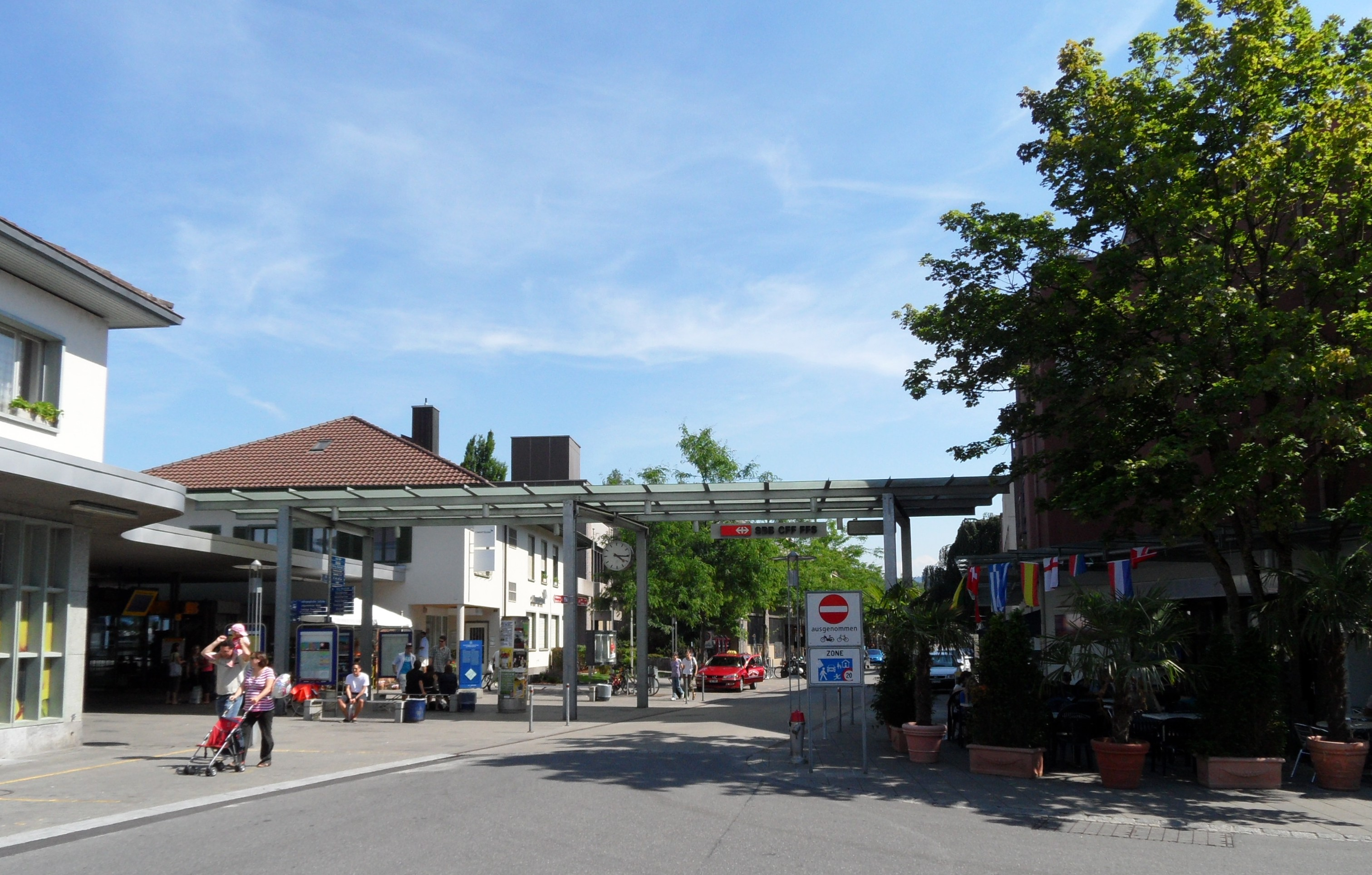
- The station building in 2010

General information
- Location: Lyss; Switzerland
- Coordinates: 47°04′35″N 7°18′23″E
- Elevation: 444 m (1,457 ft)
- Owner: Swiss Federal Railways
- Lines: Biel/Bienne–Bern line; Lyss–Solothurn line; Palézieux–Lyss line
- Distance: 23.4 km (14.5 mi) from Bern; 100.7 km (62.6 mi) from Lausanne
- Platforms: 5: 1 side platform; 2 island platforms
- Tracks: 6
- Train operators: BLS AG
- Connections: Regionalverkehr Bern-Solothurn buses; PostAuto AG buses; Aare Seeland mobil buses

Construction
- Parking: Yes (116 spaces)
- Cycle facilities: Yes (593 spaces)
- Accessible: Yes

Other information
- Station code: 8504414 (LY)
- Fare zone: 310 and 311 (Libero)

Passengers
- 2025: 10,000 per day (BLS)
- Rank: 77 out of 1,095

Services
Preceding station	BLS	Following station
Biel/Bienne Terminus	IR 65	Bern Terminus
Biel/Bienne Terminus	RE11 Weekends only	Zollikofen towards Brig
Preceding station	Bern S-Bahn	Following station
Busswil BE towards Biel/Bienne	S3	Suberg-Grossaffoltern towards Belp
Biel/Bienne Terminus	S31	Schüpfen towards Belp
Biel/Bienne Terminus	S31	Münchenbuchsee towards Belp
Lyss Grien towards Kerzers	S35	Terminus
Busswil BE towards Büren an der Aare	S36	Terminus
Location

Lyss railway station (German: Bahnhof Lyss) is a railway station in the municipality of Lyss, in the Swiss canton of Bern. It sits at the junction of the standard gauge Biel/Bienne–Bern, Lyss–Solothurn, and Palézieux–Lyss lines of Swiss Federal Railways.

== Services ==
As of the December 2024 timetable change, the following services stop at Lyss:

- InterRegio: half-hourly service between Biel/Bienne and Bern.
- Bern S-Bahn:
  - S3: half-hourly service between Biel/Bienne and Belp.
  - S31: rush-hour service between Biel/Bienne and Belp.
  - S35: hourly service to Kerzers.
  - S36: hourly or half-hourly service to Büren an der Aare.
- RegioExpress: daily service on weekends during the high season between Biel/Bienne and Brig.
