= Biel/Bienne–Bern railway =

Railway line in Switzerland

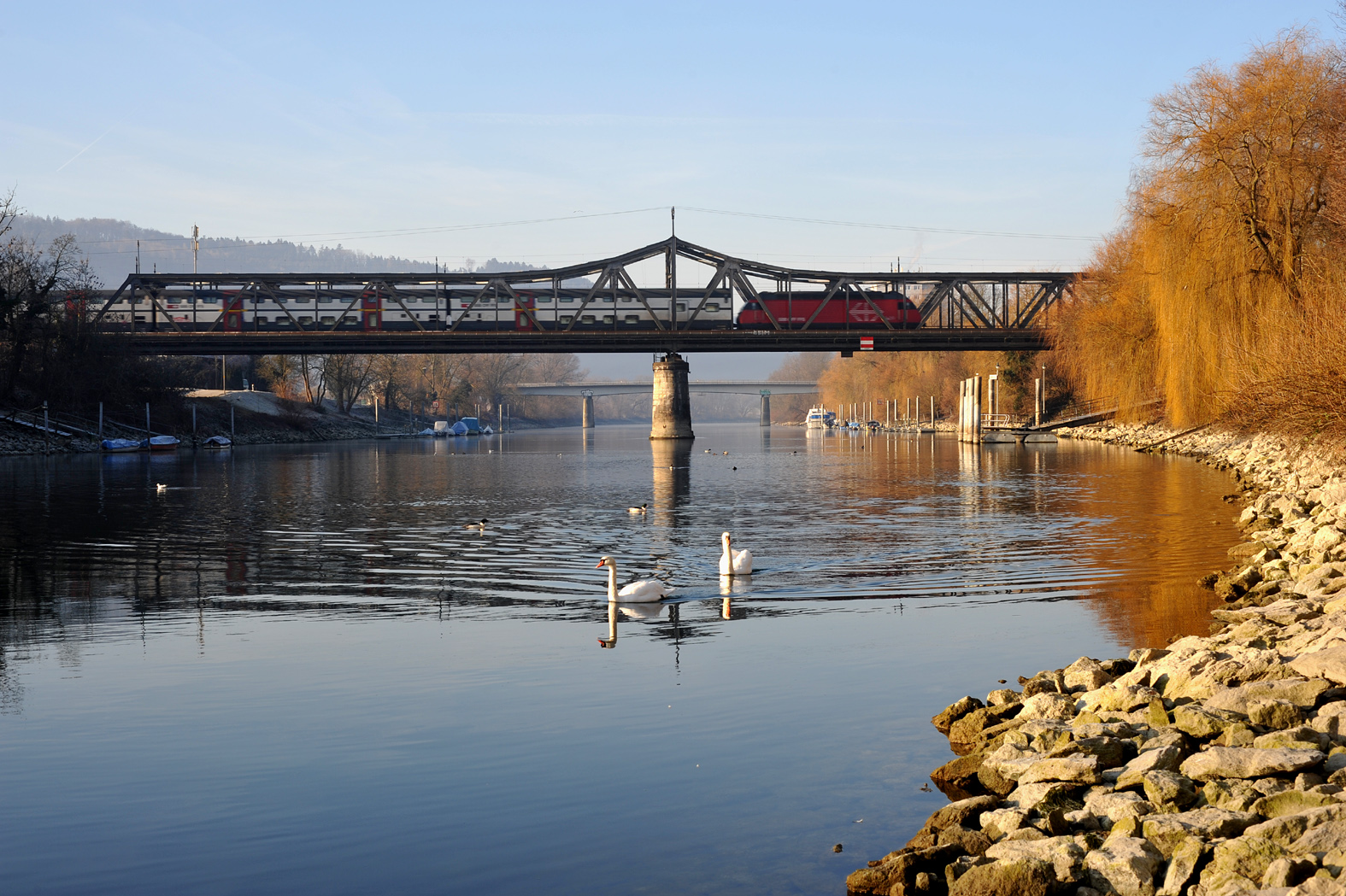
- Biel/Bienne–Bern railway

Overview
- Locale: Switzerland
- Termini: Biel/Bienne; Bern

Technical
- Number of tracks: 2
- Track gauge: 1,435 mm (4 ft 8 1/2 in)
- Electrification: 15 kV/16.7 Hz AC overhead catenary

The Biel/Bienne–Bern railway is a railway line in Switzerland and connects the city of Biel/Bienne with Bern. The line is owned by Swiss Federal Railways (SBB), long-distance services are operated by the SBB, and regional services are operated by the BLS.

== History ==
=== Bern State Railways ===
The first section between Bern Wylerfeld and Zollikofen was opened by the Swiss Central Railway (Schweizerische Centralbahn, SCB) on 16 June 1857, when it began operating its line to Olten. A little less than a year later, it was extended to today's Bern station. The extension to Biel/Bienne via Lyss was opened to traffic just under seven years after the opening of the line to Zollikofen. This line was built by the Bern State Railways (Bernische Staatsbahn). The section was part of the Bern State Railway, which ran from La Neuveville via Biel/Bienne and Bern to Langnau. This opening was accompanied by changes to the stations at both Bern and Biel, but also by the duplication of the SCB line from Zollikofen to Bern. In 1884, the Bern State Railway was absorbed into the Jura-Bern-Luzern Railway (Jura-Bern-Luzern-Bahn), which in turn was merged with the Western Switzerland–Simplon Company (Compagnie de la Suisse Occidentale et du Simplon, SOS) to form the Jura-Simplon Railway (Jura-Simplon-Bahn, JS) in 1890/91. When the JS merged with the SCB, Swiss Northeastern Railway (Schweizerische Nordostbahn, NOB) and the United Swiss Railways (Vereinigte Schweizerbahnen, VSB) to form the Swiss Federal Railways in 1902, the line between Biel and Bern was owned by a single company for the first time.

=== Development and electrification ===
The line was electrified in three stages, with the section between Bern and Wylerfeld being electrified in 1919. The SBB electrification of the line to Thun in 1927 meant that the line to Zollikofen was also electrified. The remainder to Biel was electrified before 1928.

Duplication of the tracks took place in several stages from 1859 to 1996. Before the takeover by the SBB, only the Bern–Zollikofen and the Busswil–Lyss sections (which formed part of the Lausanne–Payerne–Lyss–Solothurn railway) had been duplicated. The Zollikofen–Münchenbuchsee section was duplicated in 1933 and the remaining gaps were duplicated from 1962. The last two-track section between Schüpfen and Suberg-Grossaffoltern was opened on 19 August 1996.

A station opened in Studen at the end of May 1999.

=== Third track Zollikofen-Rütti ===
A groundbreaking ceremony was carried out for the construction of a third track between Zollikofen and the area of Rütti in 2009. Previously, the two double tracks from Biel and Olten merged in Zollikofen into one set of double tracks continuing to Rüti, where three tracks run to Bern. Closing this bottleneck allowed, on the one hand, the increase of services on the Biel line, and on the other hand, the improvement of access for trains from Thun, so that all RegioExpress trains from Brig and Zweisimmen could run to Bern. In this context, all tracks from Bern are connected to the line to Thun.

At the timetable change in December 2011, the BLS upgraded its S-Bahn service between Bern and Münchenbuchsee to run every quarter of an hour as a result of the opening of the third track between Zollikofen and Rütti. At the same time, the SBB abolished the RegioExpress stop in Münchenbuchsee.

== Rail services ==
=== RegioExpress ===
On the Biel–Bern line RegioExpress services run every half hour and are mainly operated with Stadler KISS sets or IC2000 double-deck sets hauled by Re 460 locomotives. The journey takes 25 minutes with a stop in Lyss. The RegioExpress is operated by the SBB; one train an hour is operated by SBB on a commercial basis, while the other one is subsidised by the canton. In the past, the trains were operated as InterRegio services but have been reclassified as RegioExpress services because the running time is less than an hour.

=== Regional services ===
The Bern S-Bahn line S3 services, which also run every half hour, last ten minutes longer (35 minutes) and run from Biel to Bern and on through the Gürbe Valley to Belp. At peak times, S31 services from Belp to Münchenbuchsee are extended to Biel with stops in Schüpfen and Lyss. The S-Bahn services are operated by BLS.

== Sources ==
- Trüb, Walter (1988). 100 Jahre elektrische Bahnen in der Schweiz (in German). Orell Füssli. p. 79.
- Wägli, Hans G. (2010). Schienennetz Schweiz, Réseau Ferré suisse (in German) (3 ed.). AS Verlag. ISBN 978-3-909111-74-9.
