= Jolimont (mountain) =

Hill in the Seeland, Switzerland

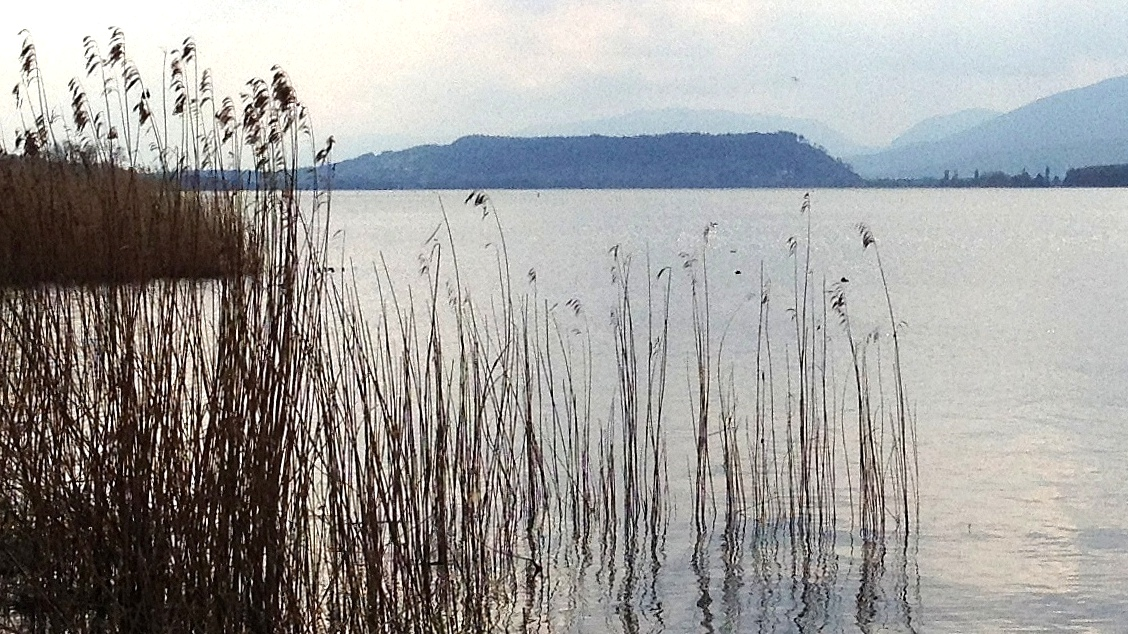
- The Jolimont seen from Lake of Bienne

Highest point
- Elevation: 603 m (1,978 ft)
- Prominence: 156 m (512 ft)
- Coordinates: 47°01′31″N 07°03′41″E

Geography
- Location within Switzerland
- Location: Bern, Switzerland

Climbing
- Easiest route: Trail

The Jolimont is a hill that stretches Southwest to Northeast for about 4 km along the Thielle canal, between the Lake of Neuchâtel and the Lake of Bienne, in the Seeland, Switzerland.

The Jolimont elevation starts in Gampelen till Erlach (fr. Cerlier), where its promontory into the Lake of Bienne builds both the Isthmus and the St. Petersinsel peninsula. North, nestled between it and the Thielle canal lies Gals and, at its southern side, Tschugg.

== Vineyards ==
The sunny side slopes of the Jolimont are ideal for growing grapes, mostly chasselas.

== Panorama ==
The hilltop offers an extraordinary view on the Castle of Erlach, which was erected during the 11th Century, protecting Erlach's picturesque old town, erected on terraces along the steep descend of "Schlossberg" toward the lake and the St. Petersinsel.

== Archaeology ==
The Jolimont is located within an area rich in archaeological sites, at the side of an important waterway. Local historians have explored the hill since the 14th Century. Isolated objects of almost all areas, undetermined defensive systems and vestiges of Roman housings indicate the early presence of mankind on the summit plateau. Three tumulus excavated in 1847 contained tombs with furniture dating back to the medium Bronze era (including weapons found in the men's tombs from the 2nd Millennium B.C. and the Hallstatt era (approx. 500 B.C.). A Roman road leading to Petinesca (Studen) on the side of the lake of Bienne, passed at the southern side of the Jolimont, reaching the Steiacher ‘’villa’’ on the Tschugg territory.

== Sources & Reference ==
- Dictionnaire historique de la Suisse (in French)
- Official Report and Map (in German)

== Bibliography ==
- -H.-M. von Kaenel et al., «Das Seeland in ur- und frühgeschichtlicher Zeit», in Jahrbuch der Geographischen Gesellschaft von Bern, 53, 1977–1979, 71-165, author : Felix Müller (Berne) / PM

== Map ==
- map.search.ch: Carte: Jolimont, 3235 Erlach
