= Jolimont =

Jolimont may refer to:

- Jolimont, Victoria, a locality within East Melbourne
  - Jolimont railway station
- Jolimont, Western Australia
- Jolimont (mountain), in the Swiss Jura
