= Tschugg =

- Municipality
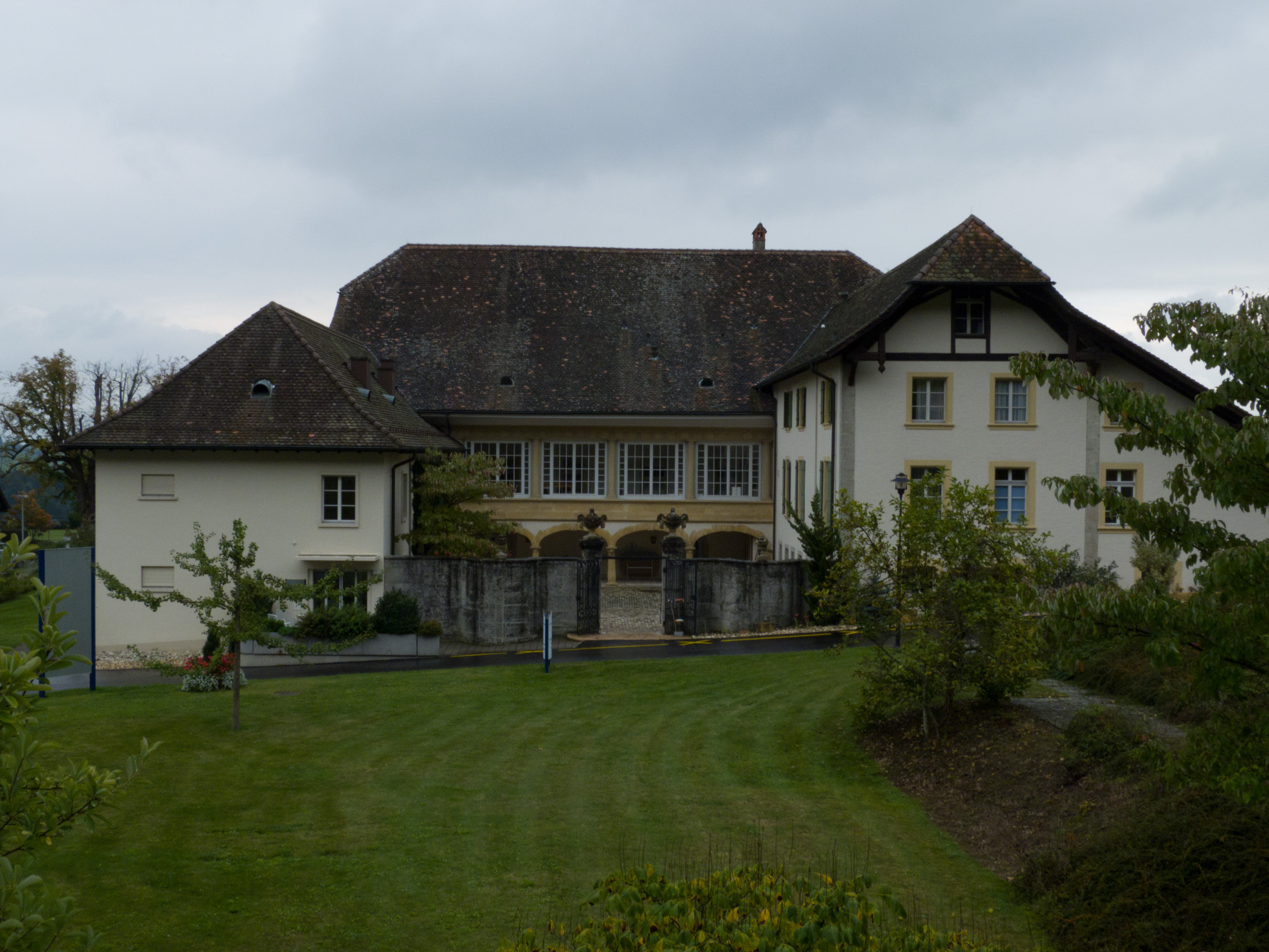
- Former country manor house Steiger near Tschugg village

- Flag Coat of arms
- Location of Tschugg
- Location within Switzerland Location within Canton of Bern
- Coordinates: 47°1′N 7°4′E
- Country: Switzerland
- Canton: Bern
- District: Seeland

Area
  - Total: 3.3 km^{2} (1.3 sq mi)
- Elevation: 492 m (1,614 ft)

Population (Dec 2011)
  - Total: 448
  - Density: 140/km^{2} (350/sq mi)
- Time zone: UTC+01:00 (CET)
  - Summer (DST): UTC+02:00 (CEST)
- Postal code: 3233
- SFOS number: 501
- ISO 3166 code: CH-BE
- Surrounded by: Erlach, Gals, Gampelen, Ins
- Website: www.tschugg.ch

Tschugg is a municipality in the Seeland administrative district in the canton of Bern in Switzerland.

== History ==
Tschugg is first mentioned in 1221 as Shuc.

The oldest trace of a settlement in the area is a Bronze Age settlement and an overlying Roman estate from the 1st to 3rd century at Steiacher. An additional Roman village was found in Mullen village. Copper and bronze waste and fragments from a foundry have been found at Riedernacker, though it is impossible to determine the age of the scrap. The village was originally part of the Herrschaft of Erlach. In 1474 all of the Erlach lands were acquired by Bern and Tschugg became part of the Bernese court of Ins. The major landholder in the village was a local noble family, the Berseth family. Their manor house was first mentioned in 1358 along with its attached vineyards. By the 16th century the Berseths were citizens of Bern. In 1678 the Steiger family acquired the Berseth estate and the village. In the following century, they rebuilt the house into a grand country manor house, which came to be known as the Landsitz Steiger. During the 19th century, the Canton of Bern bought the manor house. In 1889, it was converted into the Bethesda Hospital, a clinic for neurological rehabilitation.

The meadow between Tschugg village and Foferen was drained in 1885 and developed. The once important viticulture industry was devastated in 1900 due to disease, though a few vineyards were replanted starting in 1974. In 1879 there were 42 hectares (100 acres) of vineyards, by 2011 it was only 6 hectares (15 acres).

Mullen was first mentioned in 1185 and again in 1221 as curia de Mulnet. It originally belonged to the St. Johannsen Abbey. After the Protestant Reformation in 1528, the Abbey's land was secularized and the village came under Bernese control. It became an independent political municipality in 1832 but the population remained low. In 1764 the total population was only 66 and by 1900 had dropped to 55. The village school was in Tschugg and Mullen had other ties to Tschugg as well. In 1946 the residents of Mullen voted to join the political municipality of Tschugg.

== Geography ==
Tschugg has an area of 3.29 km^{2} (1.27 sq mi). Of this area, 1.46 km^{2} (0.56 mi^{2}) or 44.4% is used for agricultural purposes, while 1.49 km^{2} (0.58 mi^{2}) or 45.3% is forested. Of the rest of the land, 0.36 km^{2} (0.14 mi^{2}) or 10.9% is settled (buildings or roads), 0.01 km^{2} (2.5 acres) or 0.3% is either rivers or lakes.

Of the built up area, housing and buildings made up 7.3% and transportation infrastructure made up 1.8%. while parks, green belts and sports fields made up 1.5%. Out of the forested land, all of the forested land area is covered with heavy forests. Of the agricultural land, 28.6% is used for growing crops and 12.5% is pastures, while 3.3% is used for orchards or vine crops. All the water in the municipality is flowing water.

The municipality is located on the south-east slope of Jolimont mountain. It consists of the village of Tschugg and since 1946, the small village of Mullen.

On 31 December 2009 Amtsbezirk Erlach, the municipality's former district, was dissolved. On the following day, 1 January 2010, it joined the newly created Verwaltungskreis Seeland.

== Coat of arms ==
The blazon of the municipal coat of arms is Gules a Sickle Argent handled Or.

== Demographics ==
Tschugg has a population (as of December 2020) of 470. As of 2010, 17.5% of the population are resident foreign nationals. Over the last 10 years (2000-2010) the population has changed at a rate of 4.7%. Migration accounted for 4.7%, while births and deaths accounted for 0%.

Most of the population (as of 2000) speaks German (471 or 90.2%) as their first language, French is the second most common (18 or 3.4%) and Albanian is the third (9 or 1.7%). There are 8 people who speak Italian.

As of 2008, the population was 48.7% male and 51.3% female. The population was made up of 179 Swiss men (40.1% of the population) and 38 (8.5%) non-Swiss men. There were 189 Swiss women (42.4%) and 40 (9.0%) non-Swiss women. Of the population in the municipality, 120 or about 23.0% were born in Tschugg and lived there in 2000. There were 212 or 40.6% who were born in the same canton, while 75 or 14.4% were born somewhere else in Switzerland, and 62 or 11.9% were born outside of Switzerland.

As of 2010, children and teenagers (0–19 years old) make up 18.8% of the population, while adults (20–64 years old) make up 65.9% and seniors (over 64 years old) make up 15.2%.

As of 2000, there were 277 people who were single and never married in the municipality. There were 212 married individuals, 19 widows or widowers and 14 individuals who are divorced.

As of 2000, there were 60 households that consist of only one person and 16 households with five or more people. In 2000, a total of 174 apartments (88.8% of the total) were permanently occupied, while 14 apartments (7.1%) were seasonally occupied and 8 apartments (4.1%) were empty. As of 2010, the construction rate of new housing units was 4.5 new units per 1000 residents. The vacancy rate for the municipality, in 2011, was 0.44%.

The historical population is given in the following chart:

== Heritage sites of national significance ==
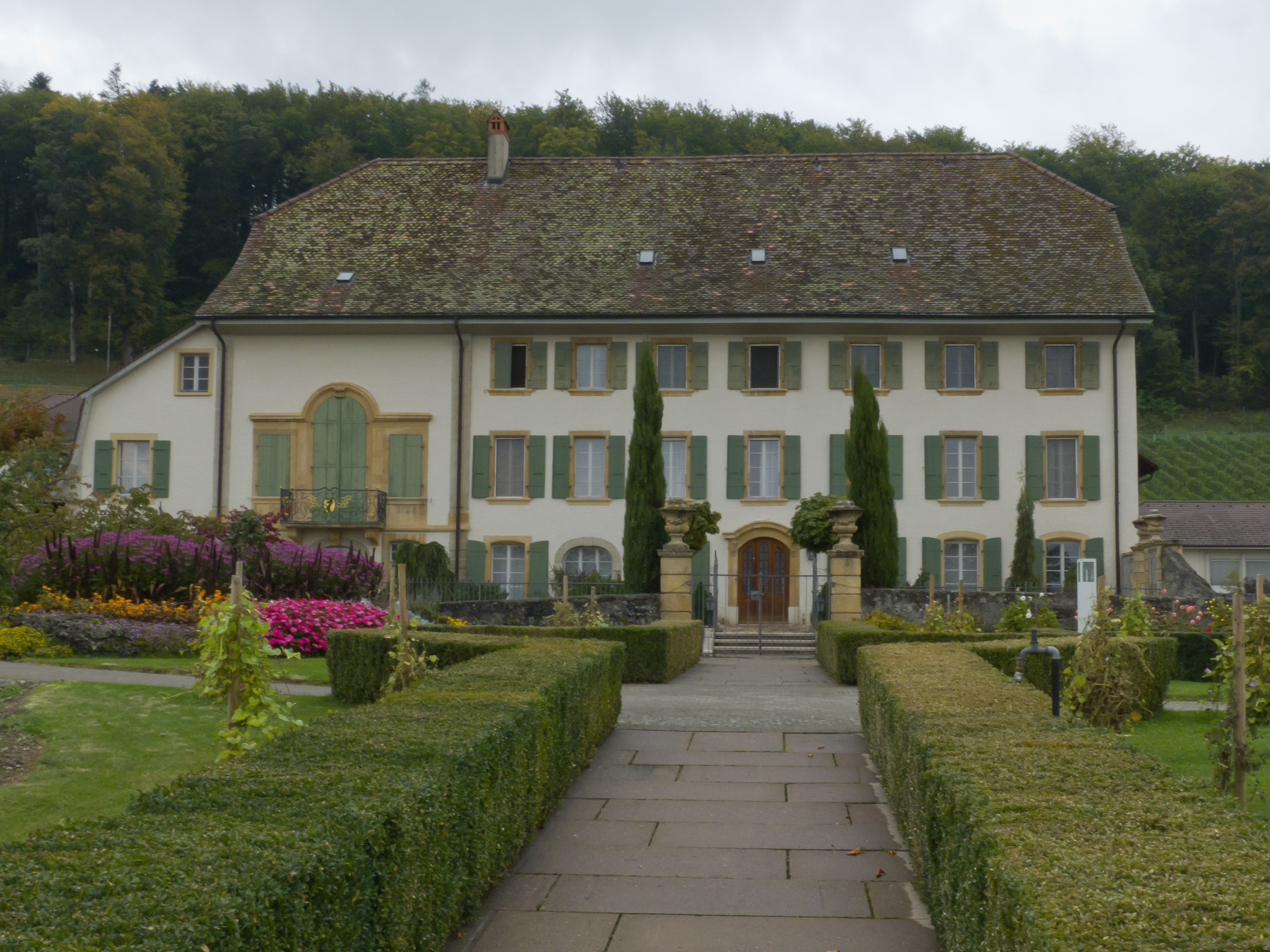
The former Landgut Steiger

The former Landgut (country manor house) Steiger is listed as a Swiss heritage site of national significance.

== Politics ==
In the 2011 federal election the most popular party was the Swiss People's Party (SVP) which received 28.1% of the vote. The next three most popular parties were the Conservative Democratic Party (BDP) (19.4%), the Green Party (15.8%) and the Social Democratic Party (SP) (15.6%). In the federal election, a total of 153 votes were cast, and the voter turnout was 48.0%.

== Economy ==
The largest employer in the municipality is the Bethesda Hospital, a clinic for neurological rehabilitation housed in the former Landgut (country manor house) Steiger.

As of 2011, Tschugg had an unemployment rate of 1.53%. As of 2008, there were a total of 372 people employed in the municipality. Of these, there were 22 people employed in the primary economic sector and about 7 businesses involved in this sector. 10 people were employed in the secondary sector and there were 4 businesses in this sector. 340 people were employed in the tertiary sector, with 11 businesses in this sector. There were 232 residents of the municipality who were employed in some capacity, of which females made up 47.0% of the workforce.

In 2008 there were a total of 291 full-time equivalent jobs. The number of jobs in the primary sector was 12, all of which were in agriculture. The number of jobs in the secondary sector was 8 of which 6 or (75.0%) were in manufacturing and 2 (25.0%) were in construction. The number of jobs in the tertiary sector was 271. In the tertiary sector; 3 or 1.1% were in the movement and storage of goods, 8 or 3.0% were in a hotel or restaurant, 4 or 1.5% were technical professionals or scientists, 3 or 1.1% were in education and 249 or 91.9% were in health care.

In 2000, there were 222 workers who commuted into the municipality and 130 workers who commuted away. The municipality is a net importer of workers, with about 1.7 workers entering the municipality for every one leaving. Of the working population, 9.9% used public transportation to get to work, and 50% used a private car.

== Religion ==
From the 2000 census, 65 or 12.5% were Roman Catholic, while 345 or 66.1% belonged to the Swiss Reformed Church. Of the rest of the population, there were 4 members of an Orthodox church (or about 0.77% of the population), there were 2 individuals (or about 0.38% of the population) who belonged to the Christian Catholic Church, and there were 12 individuals (or about 2.30% of the population) who belonged to another Christian church. There were 13 (or about 2.49% of the population) who were Islamic. There were 2 individuals who were Buddhist and 2 individuals who were Hindu. 45 (or about 8.62% of the population) belonged to no church, are agnostic or atheist, and 38 individuals (or about 7.28% of the population) did not answer the question.

== Education ==
In Tschugg about 165 or (31.6%) of the population have completed non-mandatory upper secondary education, and 54 or (10.3%) have completed additional higher education (either university or a Fachhochschule). Of the 54 who completed tertiary schooling, 59.3% were Swiss men, 22.2% were Swiss women, 9.3% were non-Swiss men and 9.3% were non-Swiss women.

The Canton of Bern school system provides one year of non-obligatory Kindergarten, followed by six years of Primary school. This is followed by three years of obligatory lower Secondary school where the students are separated according to ability and aptitude. Following the lower Secondary students may attend additional schooling or they may enter an apprenticeship.

During the 2010-11 school year, there were a total of 41 students attending classes in Tschugg. There was one kindergarten class with a total of 15 students in the municipality. Of the kindergarten students, and 46.7% have a different mother language than the classroom language. The municipality had 2 primary classes and 26 students. Of the primary students, 3.8% were permanent or temporary residents of Switzerland (not citizens) and 34.6% have a different mother language than the classroom language.

As of 2000, there were 3 students in Tschugg who came from another municipality, while 38 residents attended schools outside the municipality.
