= Gals, Switzerland =

Gals
- Municipality
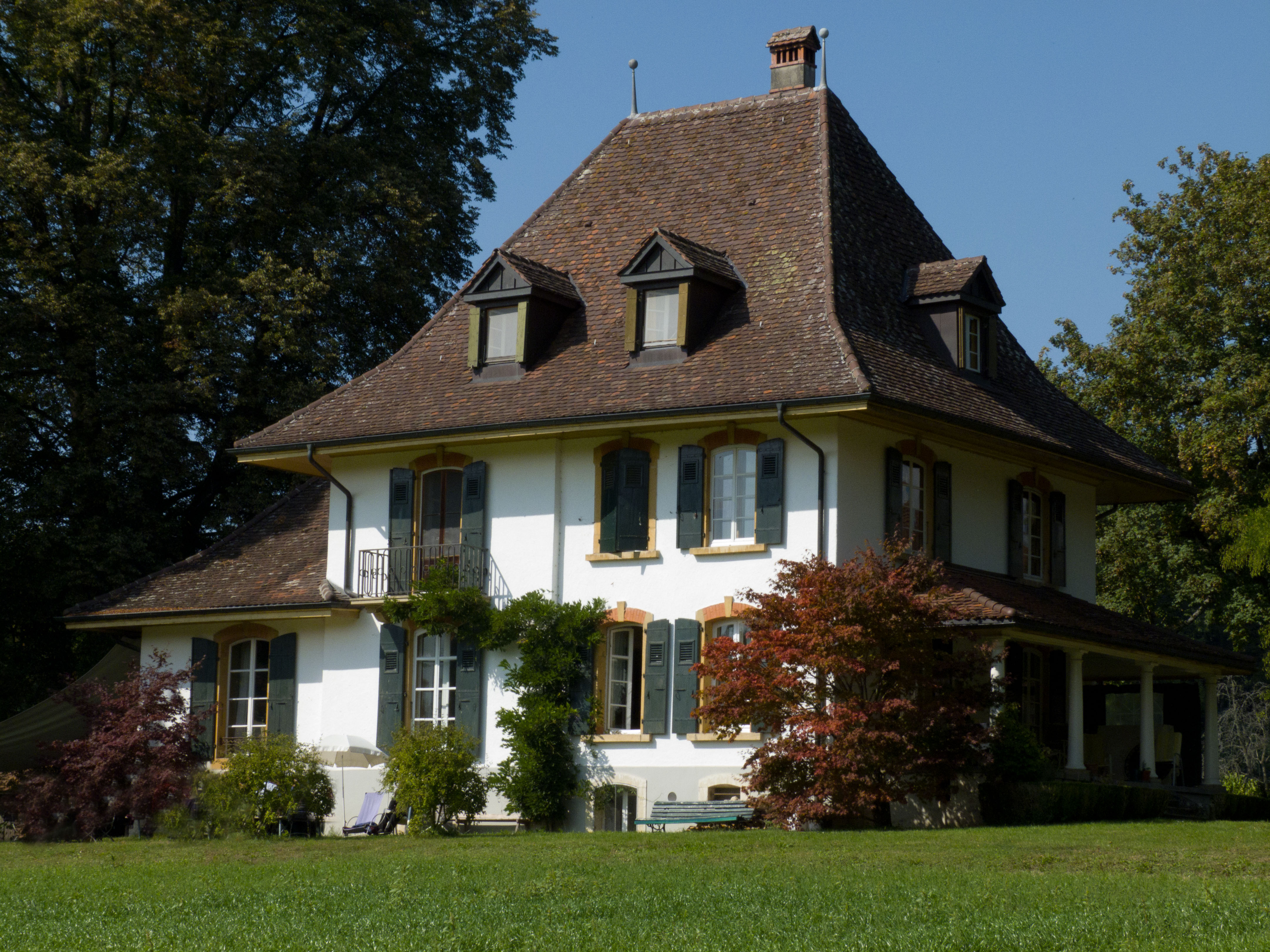
- Jolimont-Gut estate in the Gals municipality

- Flag Coat of arms
- Location of Gals
- Location within Switzerland Location within Canton of Bern
- Coordinates: 47°2′N 7°3′E
- Country: Switzerland
- Canton: Bern
- District: Seeland

Government
  - Mayor: Andres Schreyer

Area
  - Total: 7.83 km^{2} (3.02 sq mi)
- Elevation: 445 m (1,460 ft)

Population (December 2020)
  - Total: 828
  - Density: 106/km^{2} (274/sq mi)
- Time zone: UTC+01:00 (CET)
  - Summer (DST): UTC+02:00 (CEST)
- Postal code: 3238
- SFOS number: 494
- ISO 3166 code: CH-BE
- Surrounded by: Cornaux (NE), Cressier (NE), Erlach, Gampelen, La Neuveville, Le Landeron (NE), Thielle-Wavre (NE), Tschugg
- Website: www.gals.ch

Gals (French: Chules) is a municipality in the Seeland administrative district in the canton of Bern in Switzerland.

== History ==
Gals is first mentioned in 1185 as Galles. In French it was known as Chules.

The area around Gals has been inhabited for thousands of years. Some of the earliest archeological discoveries include a Bronze Age dug out canoe, Hallstatt grave mounds, La Tène and a Roman era wall. The recorded settlement was a large farm or estate that was built by the Counts of Neuchâtel. The village gradually grew up around the farm. During the 12th or 13th century the village was acquired by the Bernese Abbey of St. Johannsen. It remained part of the Abbey's land until the Abbey was secularized in 1528 during the Protestant Reformation. Gals became part of the Bernese bailiwick of Erlach. Serfdom was abolished relatively late, in 1551. The village first received a village charter in 1652. In the years 1746, 1837, 1852 and 1869, large fires ravaged the village. Between 1874 and 1883 the Zihl canal was built through the region. The canal allowed the villagers to drain the Grissachmoos marsh, which became rich farmland for sugar beets and other crops. In 1894 the village of Zihlbrücke was incorporated into Gals when the border between the Cantons of Bern and Neuchâtel was moved.

A brickyard was in operation in the village from 1658 until 1960. In the 19th century a watch parts factory opened, which provided manufacturing jobs. In 1960 the Compagnie Industrielle Radioélectrique opened a factory in Gals. In 1998 it was acquired by Alcatel Space SA. In 1883, the Canton of Bern bought and converted the Abbey of St. Johannsen into a prison, which still continues to provide jobs for the municipality.

== Geography ==
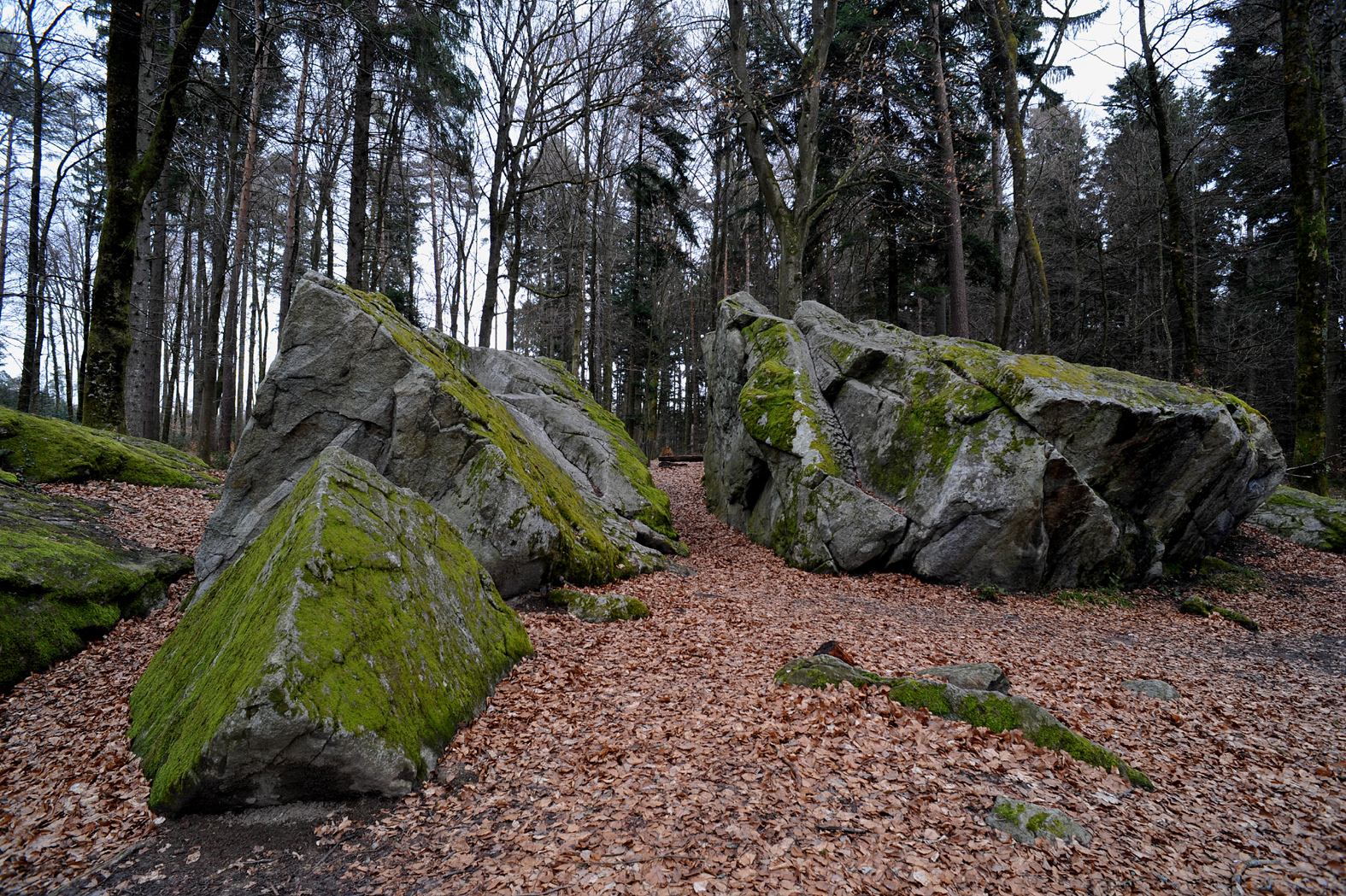
Tüfelsburdi (devils burden), three glacial erratics with a volume of approx. 400 m^{3} (14,000 ft^{3}) on the hill Jolimont

Gals has an area of 7.84 km^{2} (3.03 sq mi). Of this area, 4.19 km^{2} (1.62 mi^{2}) or 53.3% is used for agricultural purposes, while 2.67 km^{2} (1.03 mi^{2}) or 34.0% is forested. Of the rest of the land, 0.64 km^{2} (0.25 mi^{2}) or 8.1% is settled (buildings or roads), 0.4 km^{2} (0.15 mi^{2}) or 5.1% is either rivers or lakes and 0.01 km^{2} (2.5 acres) or 0.1% is unproductive land.

Of the built up area, housing and buildings made up 4.1% and transportation infrastructure made up 3.4%. Out of the forested land, 32.4% of the total land area is heavily forested and 1.5% is covered with orchards or small clusters of trees. Of the agricultural land, 46.1% is used for growing crops and 5.5% is pastures, while 1.8% is used for orchards or vine crops. All the water in the municipality is flowing water.

The municipality lies between the Zihl Canal (Thielle), Lake Biel and Jolimont. It includes the sections Bethlehem, Zihlbrücke and the Massnahmenzentrum St. Johannsen.

On 31 December 2009 Amtsbezirk Erlach, the municipality's former district, was dissolved. On the following day, 1 January 2010, it joined the newly created Verwaltungskreis Seeland.

== Coat of arms ==
The blazon of the municipal coat of arms is Gules on a Bend Argent three Fleurs-de-lis Azure.

== Demographics ==
Gals has a population (as of December 2020) of 828. As of 2010, 8.5% of the population are resident foreign nationals. Over the last 10 years (2000-2010) the population has changed at a rate of 10.4%. Migration accounted for 11.5%, while births and deaths accounted for 0.5%.

Most of the population (as of 2000) speaks German (544 or 79.0%) as their first language, French is the second most common (107 or 15.5%) and Spanish is the third (5 or 0.7%). There are 2 people who speak Italian.

As of 2008, the population was 47.9% male and 52.1% female. The population was made up of 306 Swiss men (42.6% of the population) and 38 (5.3%) non-Swiss men. There were 351 Swiss women (48.9%) and 2 (0.3%) non-Swiss women. Of the population in the municipality, 202 or about 29.3% were born in Gals and lived there in 2000. There were 205 or 29.8% who were born in the same canton, while 176 or 25.5% were born somewhere else in Switzerland, and 90 or 13.1% were born outside of Switzerland.

As of 2010, children and teenagers (0–19 years old) make up 20.8% of the population, while adults (20–64 years old) make up 60.6% and seniors (over 64 years old) make up 18.7%.

As of 2000, there were 270 people who were single and never married in the municipality. There were 359 married individuals, 33 widows or widowers and 27 individuals who are divorced.

As of 2000, there were 82 households that consist of only one person and 15 households with five or more people. In 2000, a total of 266 apartments (90.2% of the total) were permanently occupied, while 19 apartments (6.4%) were seasonally occupied and 10 apartments (3.4%) were empty. As of 2010, the construction rate of new housing units was 1.4 new units per 1000 residents. The vacancy rate for the municipality, in 2011, was 0.85%.

The historical population is given in the following chart:

== Heritage sites of national significance ==
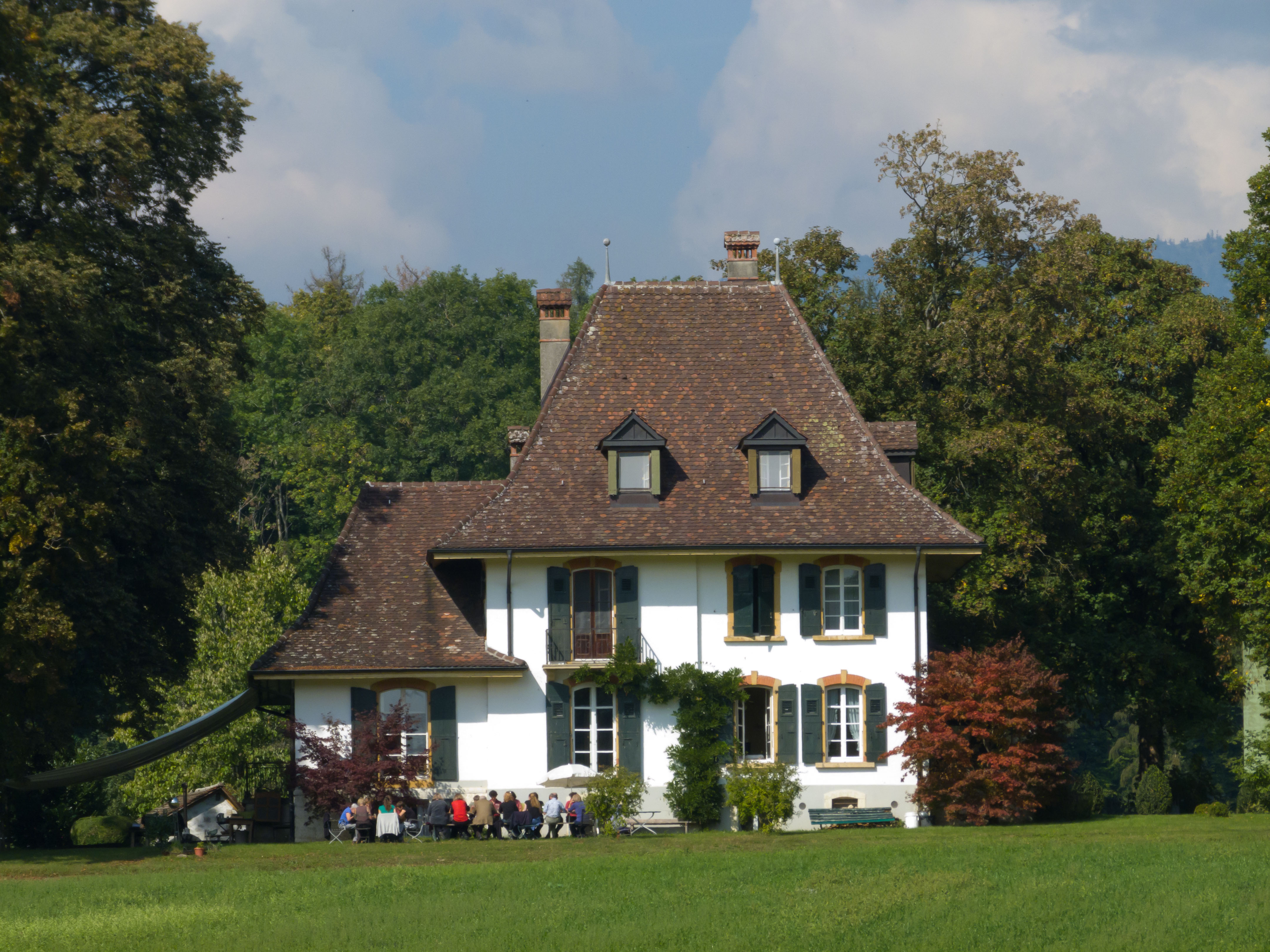
Jolimont-Gut

The prehistoric burial mounds of Jolimont & Chlosterwald and the Jolimont-Gut manor house are listed as Swiss heritage site of national significance. The entire village of Gals and the Jolimont-Gut estate are part of the Inventory of Swiss Heritage Sites.

The Jolimont-Gut manor house was originally a farm house and estate for the Abbey of St. Johannsen. By 1570 it was owned by a noble family. The estate continued to pass through numerous noble families until 1793 when it was acquired by Henri-Louis Borle who modernized the estate and farm. In 1824 it was reorganized by Frédéric de Pourtalès-Castellane into a prestigious country estate. Edouard de Pury-Wavre renovated and altered the building in 1888.

The manor house was built of stone in 1600 in the late-Gothic style. The wooden porch and Neo-Gothic round towers were added in 1835. The interior was renovated and modernized in 1890 and again in 1930. The nearby tenant's house was built before 1800 and was rebuilt following a fire in 1979. The stable with an attached apartment was built on the site of an older tenant's house. It was built in 1894 by Léo Châtelain and was originally designed as a guest house.

== Politics ==
In the 2011 federal election the most popular party was the Swiss People's Party (SVP) which received 32% of the vote. The next three most popular parties were the Conservative Democratic Party (BDP) (21.3%), the Social Democratic Party (SP) (17.2%) and the Green Party (6.7%). In the federal election, a total of 255 votes were cast, and the voter turnout was 47.3%.

== Economy ==
As of 2011, Gals had an unemployment rate of 1.71%. As of 2008, there were a total of 545 people employed in the municipality. Of these, there were 74 people employed in the primary economic sector and about 17 businesses involved in this sector. 308 people were employed in the secondary sector and there were 11 businesses in this sector. 163 people were employed in the tertiary sector, with 22 businesses in this sector. There were 394 residents of the municipality who were employed in some capacity, of which females made up 40.4% of the workforce.

In 2008 there were a total of 465 full-time equivalent jobs. The number of jobs in the primary sector was 51, all of which were in agriculture. The number of jobs in the secondary sector was 280 of which 269 or (96.1%) were in manufacturing and 12 (4.3%) were in construction. The number of jobs in the tertiary sector was 134. In the tertiary sector; 62 or 46.3% were in wholesale or retail sales or the repair of motor vehicles, 31 or 23.1% were in a hotel or restaurant, 2 or 1.5% were technical professionals or scientists, 12 or 9.0% were in education and 1 was in health care.

In 2000, there were 176 workers who commuted into the municipality and 231 workers who commuted away. The municipality is a net exporter of workers, with about 1.3 workers leaving the municipality for every one entering. Of the working population, 7.6% used public transportation to get to work, and 54.8% used a private car.

== Religion ==
From the 2000 census, 106 or 15.4% were Roman Catholic, while 434 or 63.0% belonged to the Swiss Reformed Church. Of the rest of the population, there were 11 members of an Orthodox church (or about 1.60% of the population), and there were 43 individuals (or about 6.24% of the population) who belonged to another Christian church. There was 1 individual who was Jewish, and 13 (or about 1.89% of the population) who were Islamic. There were 3 individuals who were Hindu. 89 (or about 12.92% of the population) belonged to no church, are agnostic or atheist, and 10 individuals (or about 1.45% of the population) did not answer the question.

== Education ==
In Gals about 286 or (41.5%) of the population have completed non-mandatory upper secondary education, and 88 or (12.8%) have completed additional higher education (either university or a Fachhochschule). Of the 88 who completed tertiary schooling, 56.8% were Swiss men, 27.3% were Swiss women, 6.8% were non-Swiss men and 9.1% were non-Swiss women.

The Canton of Bern school system provides one year of non-obligatory Kindergarten, followed by six years of Primary school. This is followed by three years of obligatory lower Secondary school where the students are separated according to ability and aptitude. Following the lower Secondary students may attend additional schooling or they may enter an apprenticeship.

During the 2010–11 school year, there were a total of 50 students attending classes in Gals. There were no kindergarten classes but there were 3 primary classes and 50 students. Of the primary students, 38.0% have a different mother language than the classroom language.

As of 2000, there were 2 students in Gals who came from another municipality, while 44 residents attended schools outside the municipality.
