= Gampelen railway station =

Railway station in Gampelen, Switzerland

Gampelen
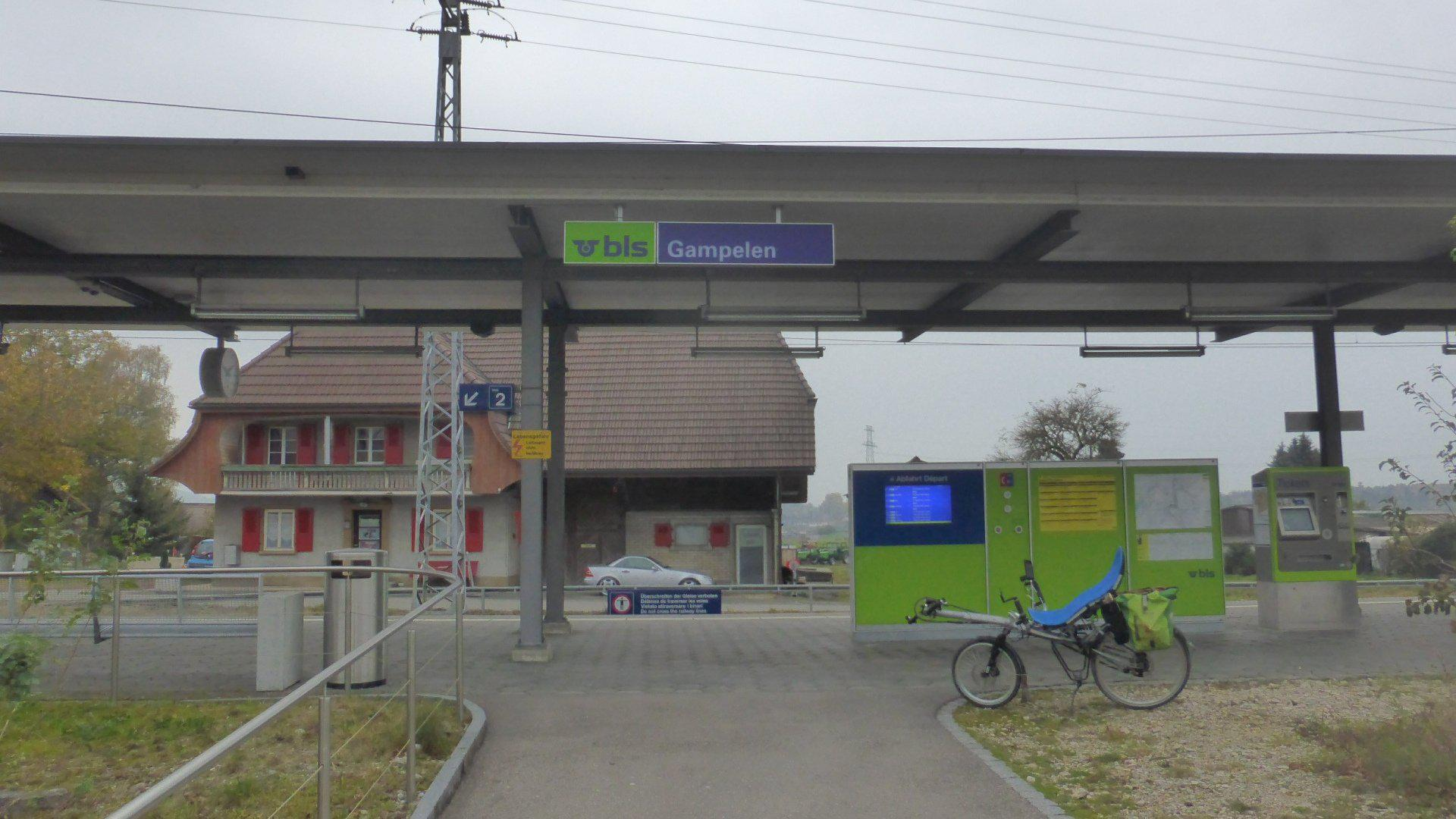
- The station platform in 2018

General information
- Location: Gampelen; Switzerland
- Coordinates: 47°00′34″N 7°03′23″E
- Elevation: 432 m (1,417 ft)
- Owner: BLS AG
- Line: Bern–Neuchâtel line
- Distance: 33.2 km (20.6 mi) from Bern
- Platforms: 2 side platforms
- Tracks: 2
- Train operators: BLS AG

Construction
- Parking: Yes (24 spaces)
- Accessible: Yes

Other information
- Station code: 8504482 (GP)
- Fare zone: 313 (Libero)

Passengers
- 2023: 160 per weekday (BLS, TPF)

Services
Preceding station	Bern S-Bahn	Following station
Zihlbrücke towards Neuchâtel	S5	Ins towards Bern
Location

Gampelen railway station (German: Bahnhof Gampelen) is a railway station in the municipality of Gampelen, in the Swiss canton of Bern. It is an intermediate stop on the standard gauge Bern–Neuchâtel line of BLS AG.

== Services ==
The following services stop at Gampelen:

- Bern S-Bahn S5: hourly service between Bern and Neuchâtel.
