= Burchard of Basle =

Burchard of Basle, also known as Burkart of Fenis, Burchard of Hasenburg or Burchard of Asuel, was a Bishop of Basel in the eleventh century and a supporter of Holy Roman Emperor Henry IV (1056–1106).

== Biography ==
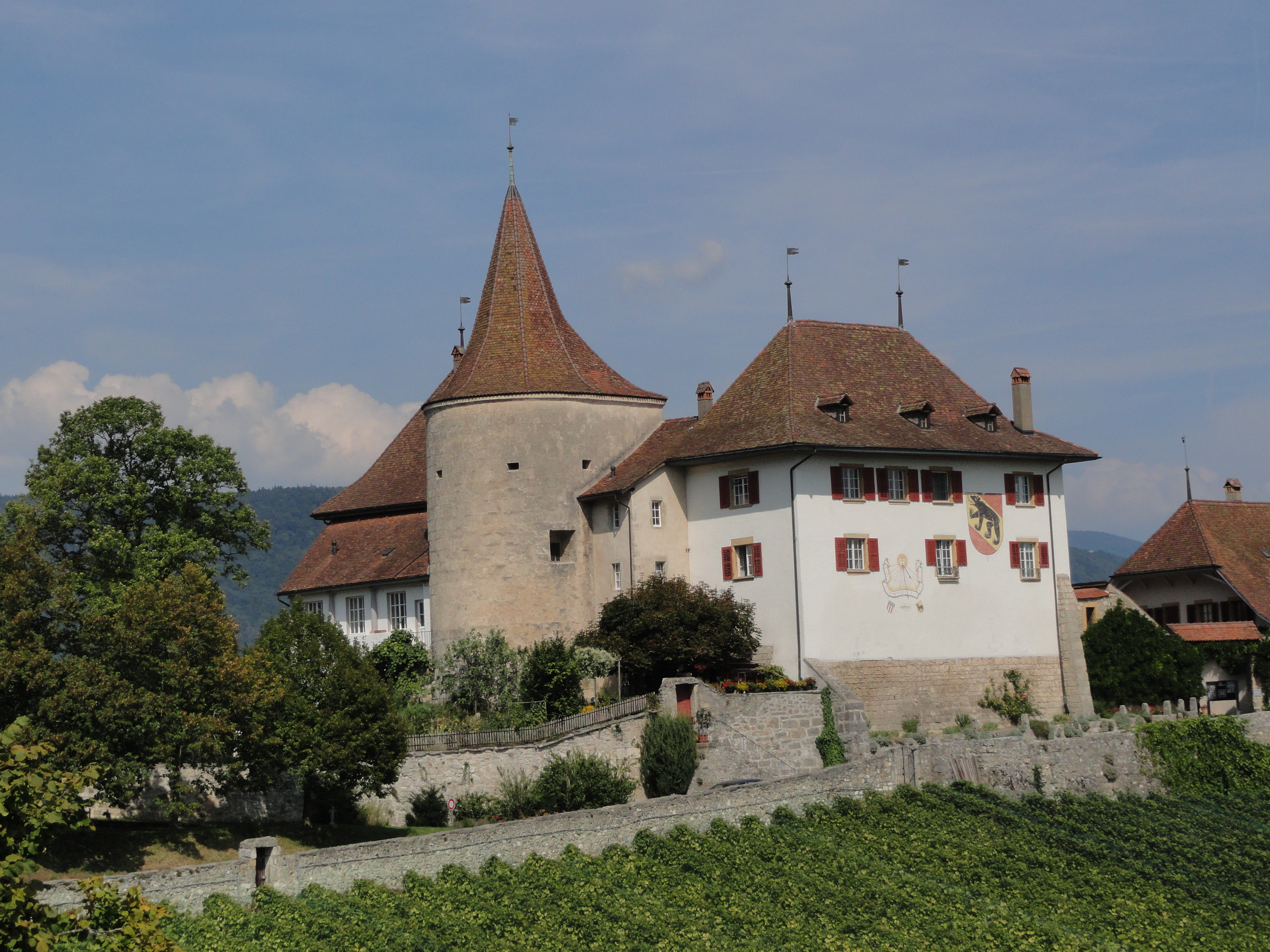
Erlach Castle, built around 1090–1100 by Burchard

Burchard belonged to the family of the counts of Neuenburg or Neuchatel and was born in the mid-eleventh century. Having entered the ecclesiastical state, in 1072 he was made Bishop of Basel by Henry IV, Holy Roman Emperor and King of the Germans; in recognition of this favour, Burchard was loyal to the king and became one of his advisers. In Henry's first difficulties with the Saxons (1073–75), Burchard rendered him full assistance.

When the Investiture Controversy between Henry and Pope Gregory VII (1073–85) broke out, Burchard was among the bishops who in January 1076 assembled at Worms, proclaimed the deposition of the pope, and wrote him an insulting letter. Together with Bishop Huzmann of Speyer, Burchard also went to Northern Italy to induce the Lombard bishops to take similar action with regard to the pope. Burchard was successful; a synod was assembled at Piacenza and the Lombard bishops renounced obedience to Gregory. For these acts the pope excommunicated and deposed Burchard in the Lenten synod of 1076; a similar sentence was inflicted on other bishops and on Henry. Henry obtained absolution at Canossa in January 1077 and Burchard, who accompanied him on the penitential pilgrimage, was reinstated in office.

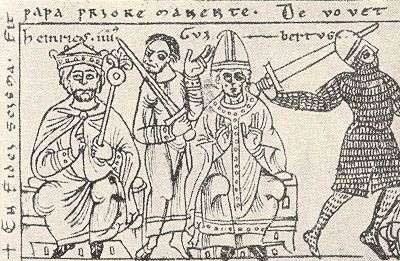
Contemporary illustration of the imperial crowning of Henry IV, Holy Roman Emperor (left), by Antipope Clement III (middle-right). Between them stands the Imperial Swordbearer Count Palatine Hermann II of Lotharingia. Picture from the chronicle of Otto of Freising, Codex Jenensis Bose (1157).

During the civil war that began in 1077 between Henry and his rival Duke Rudolf of Rheinfelden—who was raised to the throne by many princes—Burchard sided with Henry and fought in the king's interests repeatedly, both against Rudolf and his supporter Berthold of Zahringen. In 1078 Burchard and Henry suffered a crushing defeat; Burchard had to flee rapidly to save his life. However, the fortunes of war turned; Burchard and his partisans ravaged the country of Alemannia or Suabia—the home of Rudolf and Berthold—and many cruelties were committed. Churches, sanctuaries and perhaps monasteries were destroyed by the soldiery. This helped Henry's cause and weakened that of Rudolf, who was defeated and killed in 1080. Henry rewarded Burchard for his services with grants of land. It is not certain whether Burchard was present in the synod held at Brixen in Tyrol in June 1080 where the partisans of Henry again deposed Gregory VII and elected in his stead Wibert, Archbishop of Ravenna. Burchard was certainly with Henry when the king took possession of Rome on 21 March 1084. Burchard assisted at the installation of the antipope Clement III (1084–1100) on 24 March and at the imperial coronation of Henry on 31 March. Shortly afterwards Burchard returned to Germany with Henry.

In 1085, two synods were held in Germany in which Burchard, though not present, was directly concerned. The first, in late April, was held at Quedlinburg by the partisans of Gregory VII; it condemned all adversaries of the pope—including Burchard. Henry's faction held its synod at Mainz in early May; Pope Gregory and all the bishops loyal to him were deposed. For the next twenty years Burchard was less active in the cause of Henry but he remained loyal to his king. When Henry was hard-pressed in Italy by his son Conrad, who had been in rebellion since 1093, and by other enemies, Burchard was one of the few bishops of Germany who brought Henry any comfort. In 1095 Burchard appeared at the king's court at Padua, and after Henry's return to Germany Burchard paid several other visits to the royal court. Henry's dependence upon the loyalty of Burchard was made evident in a letter Henry wrote to the princes of the empire from Liège in early 1106, shortly before his death. Henry asked the princes to give him time to consult with the princes and bishops about the matters relating to his abdication or reconciliation with his rebellious son Henry V (1106–25), and among the bishops faithful to him he mentioned the name of Burchard of Basle.

After the death of Gregory VII, particularly after the election of Pope Urban II (1088–99), Burchard sought reconciliation with the Holy See; he became instrumental in the erection of several monasteries and other religious institutions. Among others, Burchard founded St. Alban's Abbey in Basle and the monastery of St. John, or Erlach Abbey, erected partly by his brother and partly by himself at Erlach in the neighbourhood of his ancestral castle. Burchard also built the chapter house of Moutier-Grandval Abbey. Despite his attachment to Henry IV, when Burchard died on 12 April 1107 he was reconciled with the pope.

== Notes ==
Attribution
