= St. Peter's Island =

Peninsula and former island situated in Lake Biel in the canton of Bern, Switzerland

Coordinates: 47°04′15″N 7°08′33″E

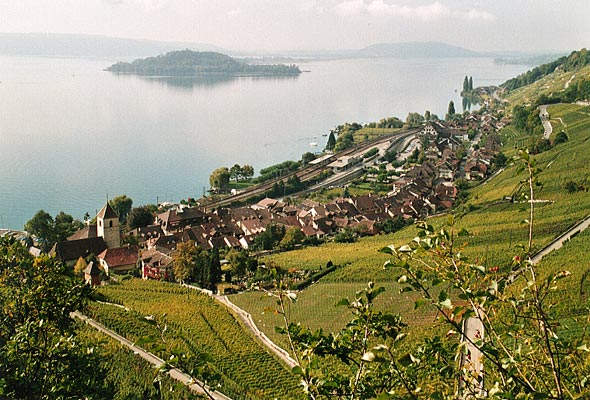
- St. Peter's Island as seen from Twann/Douanne

- Location within Canton of Bern Location within Switzerland Location within Alps
- Interactive map of St. Peter's Island

Geography
- Location: Lake Biel
- Highest elevation: 474 m (1555 ft)

Administration
- Switzerland
- Canton: Bern
- Districts: Biel/Bienne; Seeland

St. Peter's Island (French: Île Saint-Pierre; German: Sankt Petersinsel) is a peninsula and former island situated in Lake Biel in the canton of Bern, Switzerland. It has a length of about 5 kilometres (3.1 mi) and a maximum width of 800 metres (2,600 ft). Its highest point is 474 metres (1,555 ft) above sea level or 45 metres (148 ft) above lake level (429 m [ 1,407 ft ]). It was formed in the last Ice Age (see Pleistocene), when the Rhône Glacier reached as far as the Jura Mountains. It is a promontory of the Jolimont mountain, above Erlach. Politically the island is split between the municipalities of Erlach and Twann-Tüscherz, the largest part belonging to the latter municipality.

In the late nineteenth century, following the engineering works of the Jura water correction, the water-level of the three lakes of the Seeland have dropped enough to clear the until-then hidden isthmus, linking Cerlier to St. Peter's Island, which has ever since become a peninsula, although separated from the shore by a canal.

Monks of the Cluniac order were the first inhabitants of the island, and built a monastery here in 1127.

Before his expulsion, Jean-Jacques Rousseau spent two months on the island in 1765, calling it the "happiest time of his life".

== The priory ==
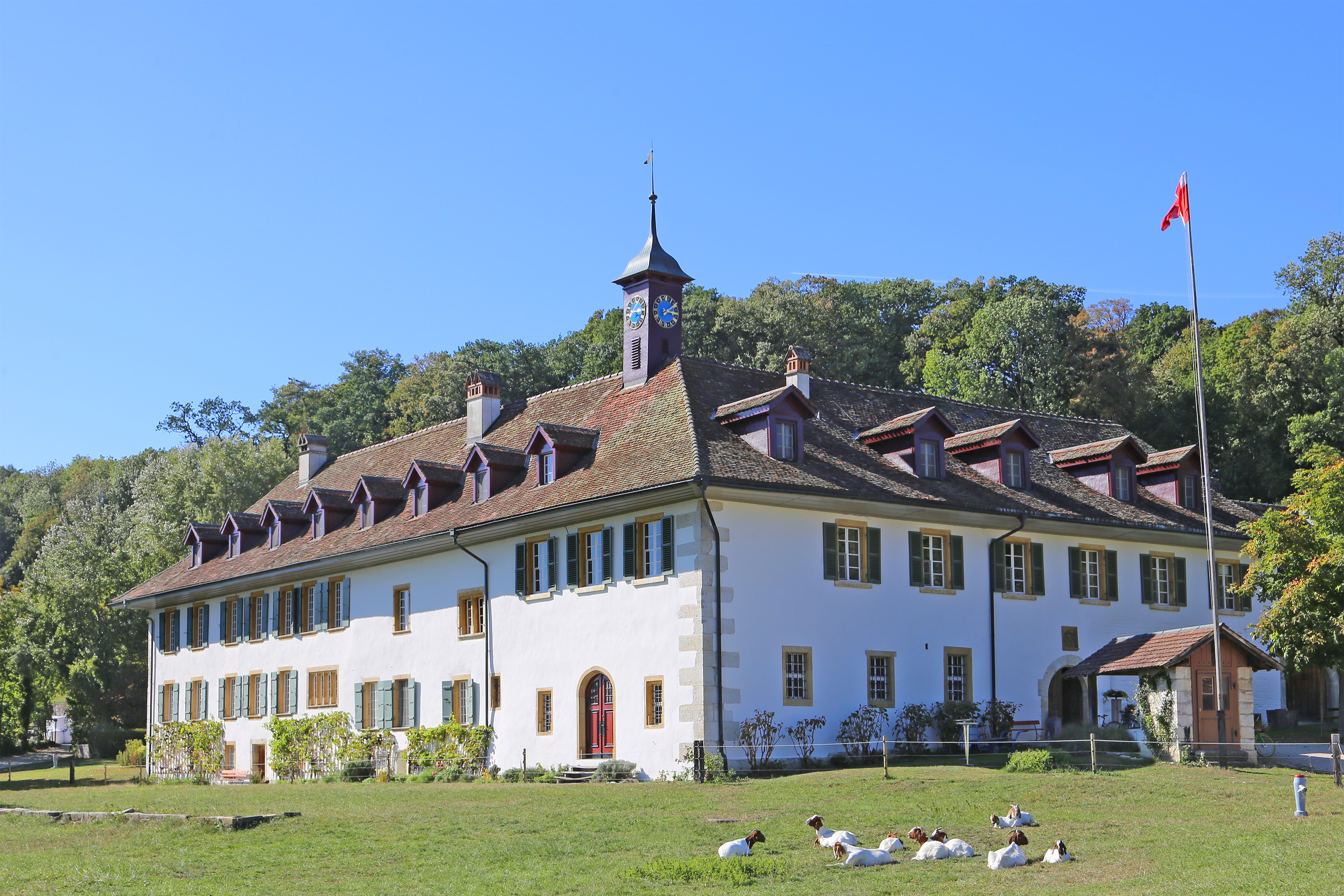
The former priory building

Aerial view (1958)

The former priory building is a listed as Swiss heritage site of national significance. It was founded in 1107 when Count Wilhelm III of Burgundy-Mâcon gave his lands in Bellmund and on the island, at the time known as the "Island of the Counts", to Cluny Abbey. A small monastery was built on the island, possibly on the site of an earlier church. Traces of Merovingian graves, a Carolingian wooden monastery and an abandoned 11th century basilica have been discovered near the current building. The small priory had at most five monks in residence and may have had additional rooms for travelers. On 10 February 1127 Wilhelm IV, the son of Wilhelm III, was buried in the monastery graveyard after he was murdered in Payerne a few days previously. A monastery church was built north of the priory in the first third of the 12th century. The vogt and patronage rights over the monastery remained with the Counts of Burgundy before probably passing to the Zähringens. They were followed by the Counts of Kyburg, in the 13th century and the Counts of Nidau in the first half of the 14th. In 1484 the priory was dissolved and the estates passed to the college of canons of St. Vinzenz Cathedral in Bern. After Bern accepted the Protestant Reformation in 1530, the priory buildings were transferred to the Niederen Spital (a hospital) in Bern. The monastery church was demolished in 1577 and a wine cellar built below the former choir. Over the following years the priory building was used as a sheep farm and an inn and it was extensively modified, renovated and rebuilt. Originally built as a four-sided building with a central courtyard, in 1810/15 the north wing was demolished turning it into a three-wing, horseshoe-shaped building. The south wing was unified under a single roof in the 19th century and in 1911 it was renovated in the Swiss Heimatstil.

Today the priory building is a hotel and restaurant.

== See also ==
- List of islands of Switzerland
- List of peninsulas
