= Erlach Abbey =

Former Benedictine monastery in Gals, Canton of Bern, Switzerland

Coordinates: 47°2′24.55″N 7°4′18.03″E

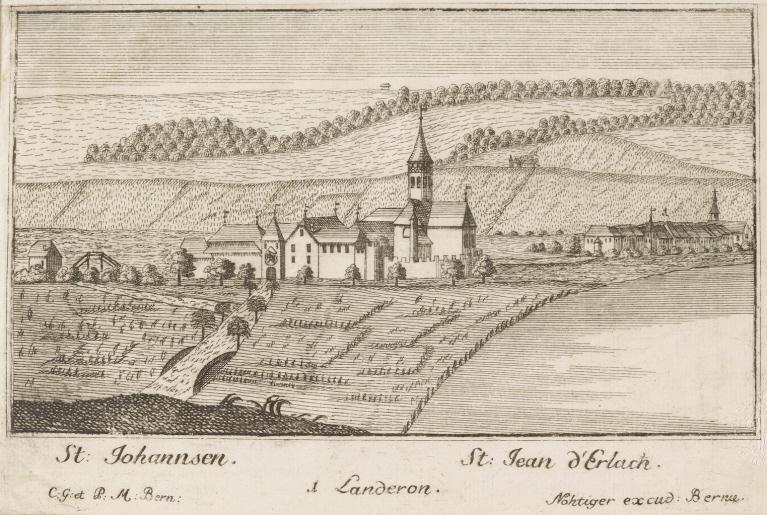
Erlach Abbey (18th-century engraving by Johann Ludwig Nöthiger)

Erlach Abbey or St. Johannsen Abbey (German: Kloster Erlach, otherwise Abtei St. Johannsen) was a Benedictine monastery in Gals, Canton of Bern, Switzerland.

It was founded between 1093 and 1103 by Kuno, Count of Fenis and Bishop of Lausanne, on land that was then an island in the river Thielle. After Kuno's death, the abbey church was completed by his brother, Burchard, bishop of Basel. The new monastery was settled by monks from Saint Blaise Abbey. The Vogtei, initially the property of the Counts of Fenis, passed from them to the Counts of Neuchâtel-Nidau, and from them at the end of the 14th century to the city of Bern, which in took over the domain of Erlach in 1474, definitively acquiring it in 1476.

The abbey was secularised between 1528 and 1529. The nave of the abbey church was demolished, but the choir and transept remained to be used for grain storage. These structures were demolished in 1961 after they had become unsafe, but the choir was rebuilt between 1970 and 1971. The other buildings remained standing, and in the 19th century were put to various industrial uses, until in 1883 the Canton of Bern bought the site back and turned it into a prison. Since 1978, it has served as an adjustment centre for young men.

== Sources and external links ==
- "Erlach (Kloster)" in German, French and Italian in the online Historical Dictionary of Switzerland.
