= Gampelen =

- Municipality
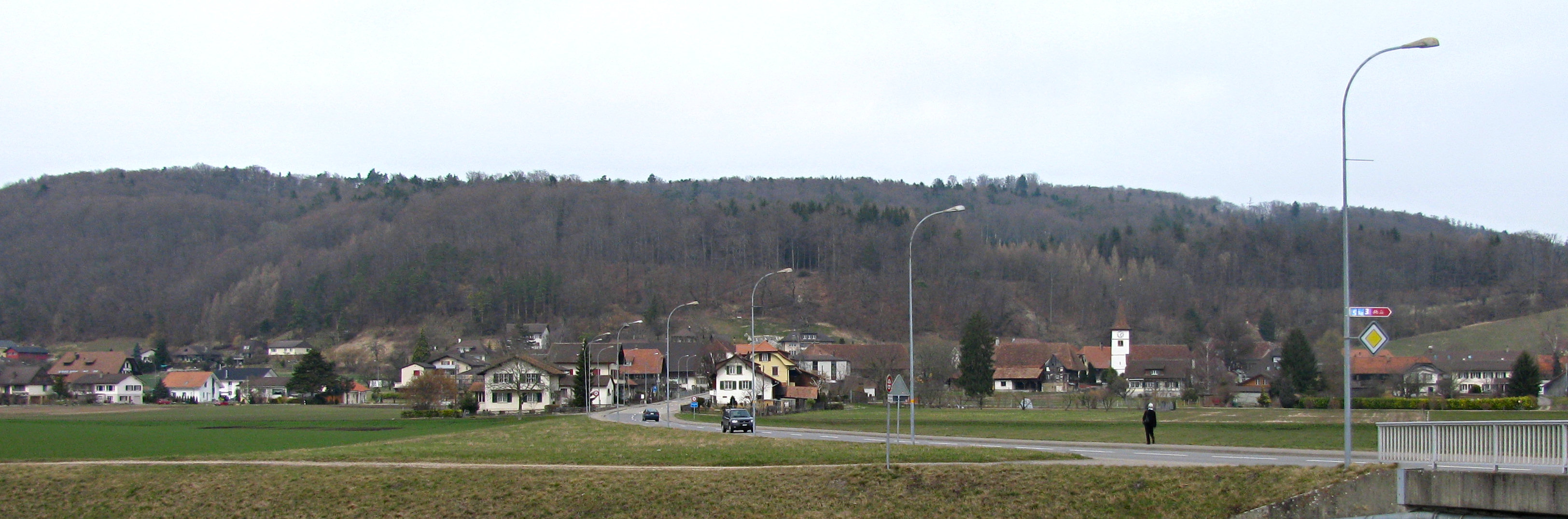

- Flag Coat of arms
- Location of Gampelen
- Location within Switzerland Location within Canton of Bern
- Coordinates: 47°1′N 7°3′E
- Country: Switzerland
- Canton: Bern
- District: Seeland

Government
  - Mayor: Peter Dietrich

Area
  - Total: 10.80 km^{2} (4.17 sq mi)
- Elevation: 436 m (1,430 ft)

Population (December 2020)
  - Total: 950
  - Density: 88/km^{2} (230/sq mi)
- Time zone: UTC+01:00 (CET)
  - Summer (DST): UTC+02:00 (CEST)
- Postal code: 3236
- SFOS number: 495
- ISO 3166 code: CH-BE
- Surrounded by: Gals, Ins, Laténa (NE), Tschugg
- Website: gampelen.ch

Gampelen (French: Champion) is a municipality in the Seeland administrative district in the canton of Bern in Switzerland. Gampelen should not be confused with the municipality Gampel in the canton of Valais.

== History ==
Gampelen is first mentioned in 1179 as Champion and again in 1228 as Champlun.

The area around Gampelen was home to several mesolithic, neolithic and Bronze Age settlements. One of the largest was a Late Bronze Age lake front settlement on Witzwil Island. Bricks, money and a dam from Roman era settlements have been found stretching from Zihlbrücke in Gals through Gampelen to Witzwil in Ins. During the Middle Ages it was part of the Herrschaft of Erlach. In 1395 the area became part of the County of Savoy. Almost a century later, in 1474, it was acquired by Bern and was placed in the bailiwick of Erlach.

The village church of St. Martin was first mentioned in 1228. It was destroyed in a fire and rebuilt in 1513 and the nave was expanded and renovated in 1674–75. The church was probably built over a Roman inn and way station. During the Protestant Reformation it became the parish church of the local parish, which eventually grew to include the neighboring municipality of Gals.

During the Middle Ages and Early Modern era, Gampelen was surrounded by extensive vineyards. Several residents grew wealthy from the vineyards and built large mansions or manor houses in the village. The Jura water correction project of 1874-83 drained the marshy meadows around the village. The former marshes became fields for sugar beet and other vegetables. In 1901 the Bern–Neuchâtel railway line was built through the town. The railway allowed the village's agricultural products to reach distant markets. Today the railway is mostly used for commuters, with about half of all workers in Gampelen commuting to jobs in nearby towns and cities. The Fanel nature preserve and bird sanctuary along the lake is a sanctuary of European importance.

== Geography ==
Gampelen has an area of 10.6 km^{2} (4.09 sq mi). Of this area, 6.14 km^{2} (2.37 mi^{2}) or 56.7% is used for agricultural purposes, while 2.71 km^{2} (1.05 mi^{2}) or 25.0% is forested. Of the rest of the land, 1.16 km^{2} (0.45 mi^{2}) or 10.7% is settled (buildings or roads), 0.23 km^{2} (0.089 mi^{2}) or 2.1% is either rivers or lakes and 0.56 km^{2} (0.22 mi^{2}) or 5.2% is unproductive land.

Of the built up area, housing and buildings made up 3.2% and transportation infrastructure made up 4.6%. while parks, green belts and sports fields made up 1.9%. Out of the forested land, all of the forested land area is covered with heavy forests. Of the agricultural land, 47.1% is used for growing crops and 8.1% is pastures, while 1.5% is used for orchards or vine crops. Of the water in the municipality, 0.3% is in lakes and 1.8% is in rivers and streams.

Gampelen is the only municipality in the canton of Bern bordering Lake Neuchâtel, and as such is the only German-speaking municipality along the lake.

The town of Gampelen has a long, thin shape, and has a railway station on the Bern-Neuenburg line of the BLS. The stop Zihlbrücke also lies within the area of the municipality.

Gampelen is part of an evangelical-reformed parish with neighboring Gals.

On 31 December 2009 Amtsbezirk Erlach, the municipality's former district, was dissolved. On the following day, 1 January 2010, it joined the newly created Verwaltungskreis Seeland.

== Coat of arms ==
The blazon of the municipal coat of arms is Gules a Bittern head erased Or.

== Demographics ==
Gampelen has a population (as of December 2020) of 950. As of 2010, 14.4% of the population are resident foreign nationals. Over the last 10 years (2000-2010) the population has changed at a rate of 8.9%. Migration accounted for 10.9%, while births and deaths accounted for 2.7%.

Most of the population (as of 2000) speaks German (689 or 84.9%) as their first language, French is the second most common (93 or 11.5%) and Portuguese is the third (7 or 0.9%). There are 5 people who speak Italian.

As of 2008, the population was 52.2% male and 47.8% female. The population was made up of 338 Swiss men (43.4% of the population) and 68 (8.7%) non-Swiss men. There were 328 Swiss women (42.2%) and 4 (0.5%) non-Swiss women. Of the population in the municipality, 270 or about 33.3% were born in Gampelen and lived there in 2000. There were 281 or 34.6% who were born in the same canton, while 158 or 19.5% were born somewhere else in Switzerland, and 67 or 8.3% were born outside of Switzerland.

As of 2010, children and teenagers (0–19 years old) make up 21.2% of the population, while adults (20–64 years old) make up 62.7% and seniors (over 64 years old) make up 16.1%.

As of 2000, there were 347 people who were single and never married in the municipality. There were 369 married individuals, 53 widows or widowers and 43 individuals who are divorced.

As of 2000, there were 71 households that consist of only one person and 18 households with five or more people. In 2000, a total of 276 apartments (86.0% of the total) were permanently occupied, while 32 apartments (10.0%) were seasonally occupied and 13 apartments (4.0%) were empty.

The historical population is given in the following chart:

== Heritage sites of national significance ==
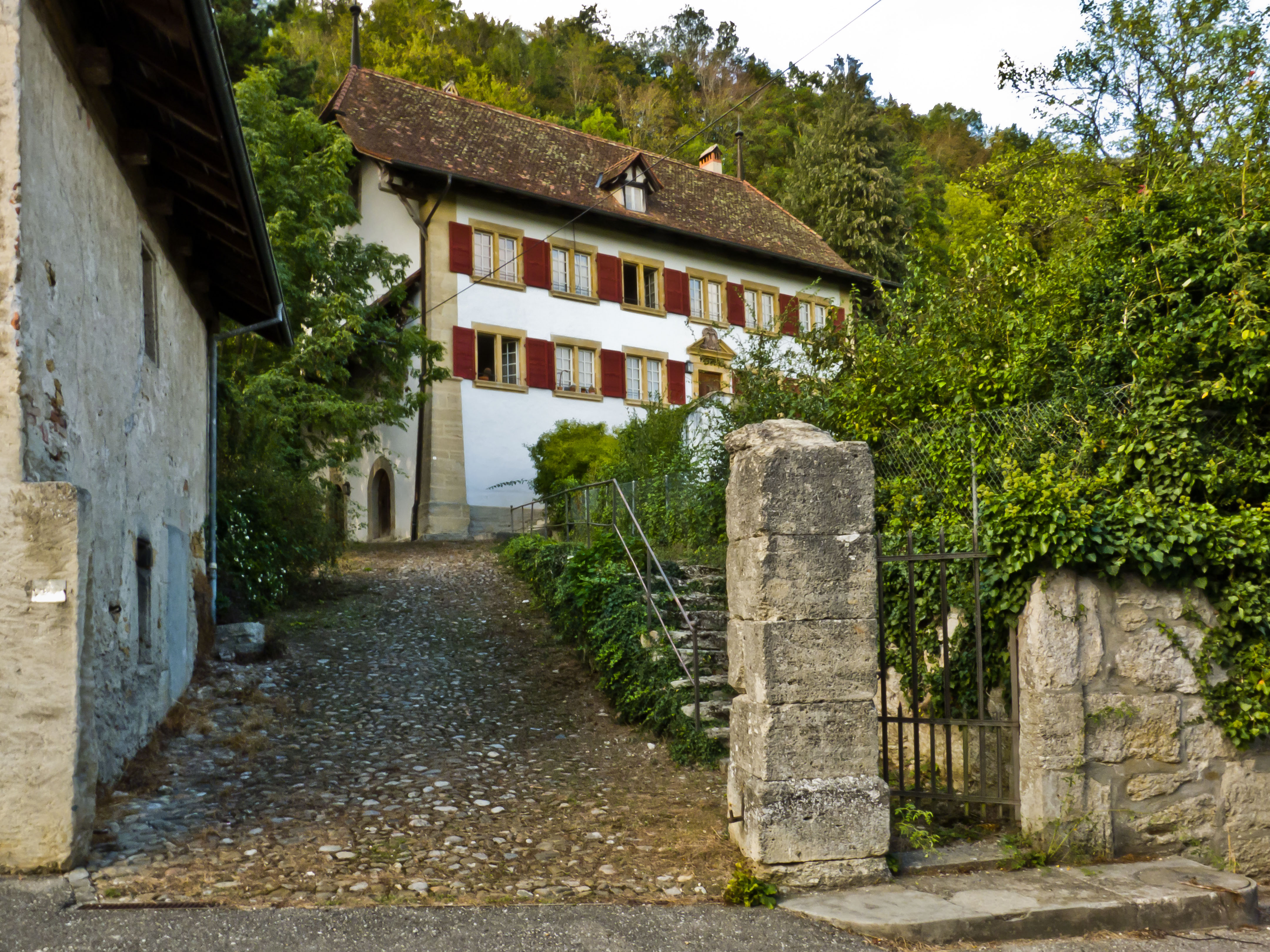
Gampelen Rectory

The Rectory is listed as a Swiss heritage site of national significance.

== Politics ==
In the 2011 federal election the most popular party was the Swiss People's Party (SVP) which received 38.3% of the vote. The next three most popular parties were the Conservative Democratic Party (BDP) (19.7%), the Social Democratic Party (SP) (14.1%) and the Federal Democratic Union of Switzerland (EDU) (5.8%). In the federal election, a total of 238 votes were cast, and the voter turnout was 42.2%.

== Economy ==
As of 2011, Gampelen had an unemployment rate of 1.44%. As of 2008, there were a total of 453 people employed in the municipality. Of these, there were 76 people employed in the primary economic sector and about 18 businesses involved in this sector. 49 people were employed in the secondary sector and there were 11 businesses in this sector. 328 people were employed in the tertiary sector, with 30 businesses in this sector. There were 402 residents of the municipality who were employed in some capacity, of which females made up 42.0% of the workforce.

In 2008 there were a total of 374 full-time equivalent jobs. The number of jobs in the primary sector was 54, all of which were in agriculture. The number of jobs in the secondary sector was 45 of which 7 or (15.6%) were in manufacturing, 5 or (11.1%) were in mining and 32 (71.1%) were in construction. The number of jobs in the tertiary sector was 275. In the tertiary sector; 60 or 21.8% were in wholesale or retail sales or the repair of motor vehicles, 6 or 2.2% were in the movement and storage of goods, 10 or 3.6% were in a hotel or restaurant, 5 or 1.8% were technical professionals or scientists, 5 or 1.8% were in education and 58 or 21.1% were in health care.

In 2000, there were 254 workers who commuted into the municipality and 229 workers who commuted away. The municipality is a net importer of workers, with about 1.1 workers entering the municipality for every one leaving. Of the working population, 10.2% used public transportation to get to work, and 51.5% used a private car.

== Religion ==
From the 2000 census, 103 or 12.7% were Roman Catholic, while 556 or 68.5% belonged to the Swiss Reformed Church. Of the rest of the population, there was 1 member of an Orthodox church, and there were 66 individuals (or about 8.13% of the population) who belonged to another Christian church. There were 2 individuals (or about 0.25% of the population) who were Jewish, and 8 (or about 0.99% of the population) who were Islamic. There was 1 person who was Buddhist and 2 individuals who were Hindu. 80 (or about 9.85% of the population) belonged to no church, are agnostic or atheist, and 26 individuals (or about 3.20% of the population) did not answer the question.

== Education ==
In Gampelen about 310 or (38.2%) of the population have completed non-mandatory upper secondary education, and 68 or (8.4%) have completed additional higher education (either university or a Fachhochschule). Of the 68 who completed tertiary schooling, 73.5% were Swiss men, 14.7% were Swiss women, 8.8% were non-Swiss men.

The Canton of Bern school system provides one year of non-obligatory Kindergarten, followed by six years of Primary school. This is followed by three years of obligatory lower Secondary school where the students are separated according to ability and aptitude. Following the lower Secondary students may attend additional schooling or they may enter an apprenticeship.

During the 2010–11 school year, there were a total of 60 students attending classes in Gampelen. There was one kindergarten class with a total of 13 students in the municipality. Of the kindergarten students, 23.1% were permanent or temporary residents of Switzerland (not citizens) and 46.2% have a different mother language than the classroom language. The municipality had 3 primary classes and 47 students. Of the primary students, 10.6% were permanent or temporary residents of Switzerland (not citizens) and 34.0% have a different mother language than the classroom language.

As of 2000, there were 8 students in Gampelen who came from another municipality, while 45 residents attended schools outside the municipality.

== Penitentiary of Witzwil ==
The main seat of the penitentiary of Witzwil lies on the municipality's territory. Witzwil is a men's prison, holding up to 200 inmates. It is also the largest farm in Switzerland with a total agricultural land area of 612 hectares.

== See also ==
- List of prisons in Switzerland
