= Erlach, Switzerland =

Erlach / Cerlier
- Municipality
- Erlach town and castle above Lake Bienne

- Flag Coat of arms
- Location of Erlach / Cerlier
- Location within Switzerland Location within Canton of Bern
- Coordinates: 47°2′N 7°5′E
- Country: Switzerland
- Canton: Bern
- District: Seeland

Area
  - Total: 3.50 km^{2} (1.35 sq mi)
- Elevation: 433 m (1,421 ft)

Population (December 2020)
  - Total: 1,386
  - Density: 396/km^{2} (1,030/sq mi)
- Time zone: UTC+01:00 (CET)
  - Summer (DST): UTC+02:00 (CEST)
- Postal code: 3235
- SFOS number: 492
- ISO 3166 code: CH-BE
- Surrounded by: Gals, Ins, La Neuveville, Tschugg, Twann, Vinelz
- Website: www.erlach.ch

Erlach (French: Cerlier) is the capital municipality of the Seeland administrative district in the canton of Berne in Switzerland.

== History ==
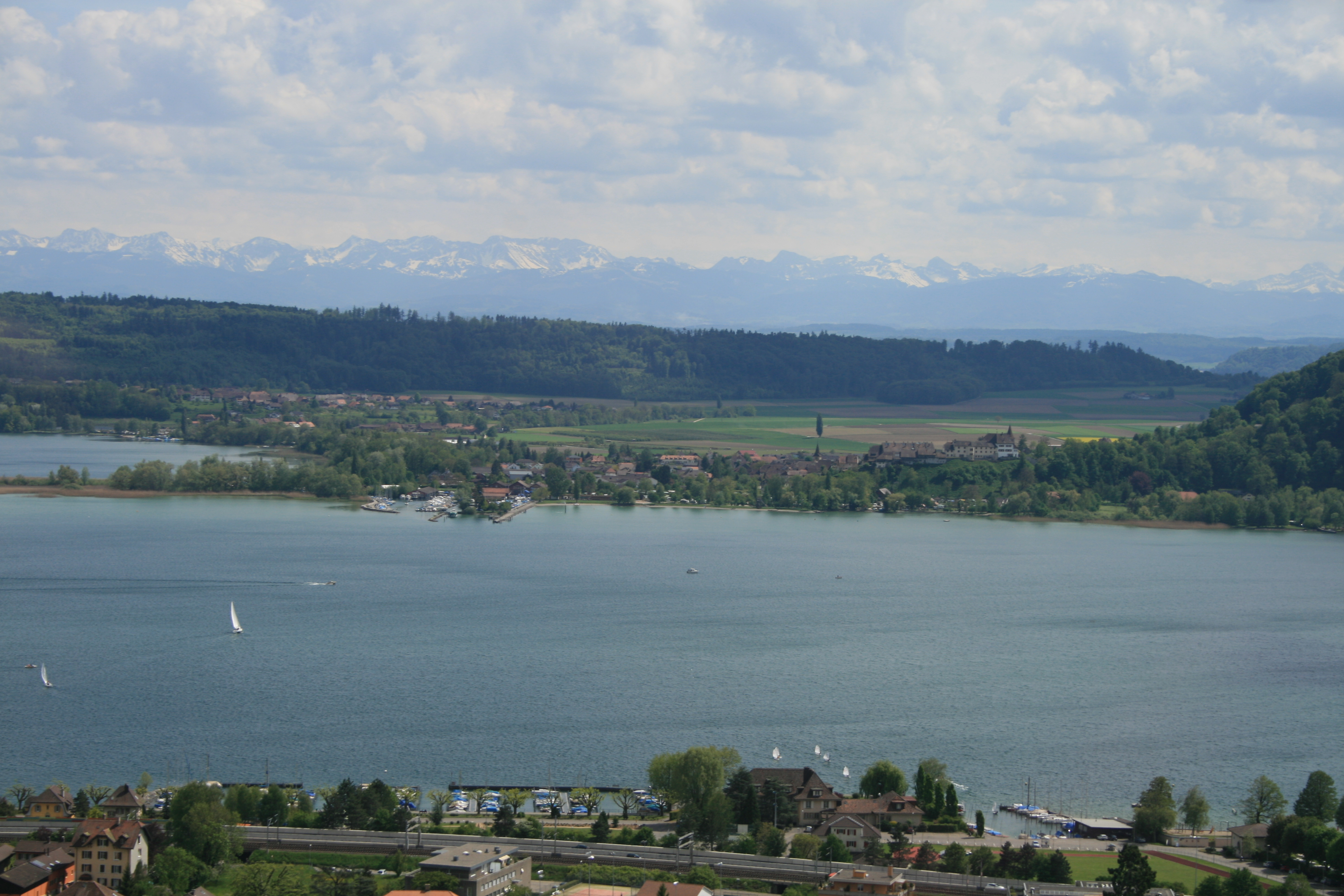
View of Erlach town with the Jolimont hills to the right

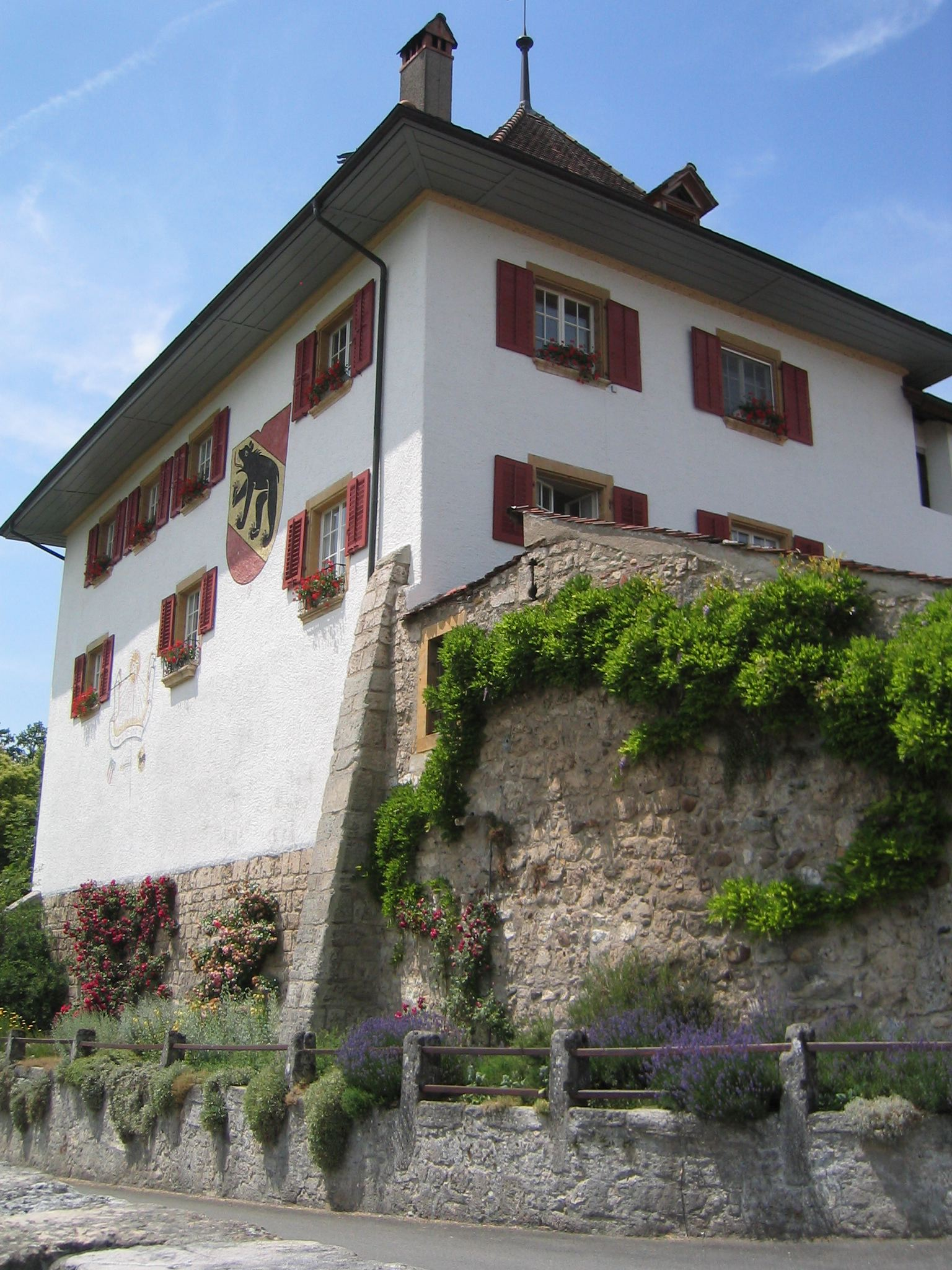
Erlach Castle

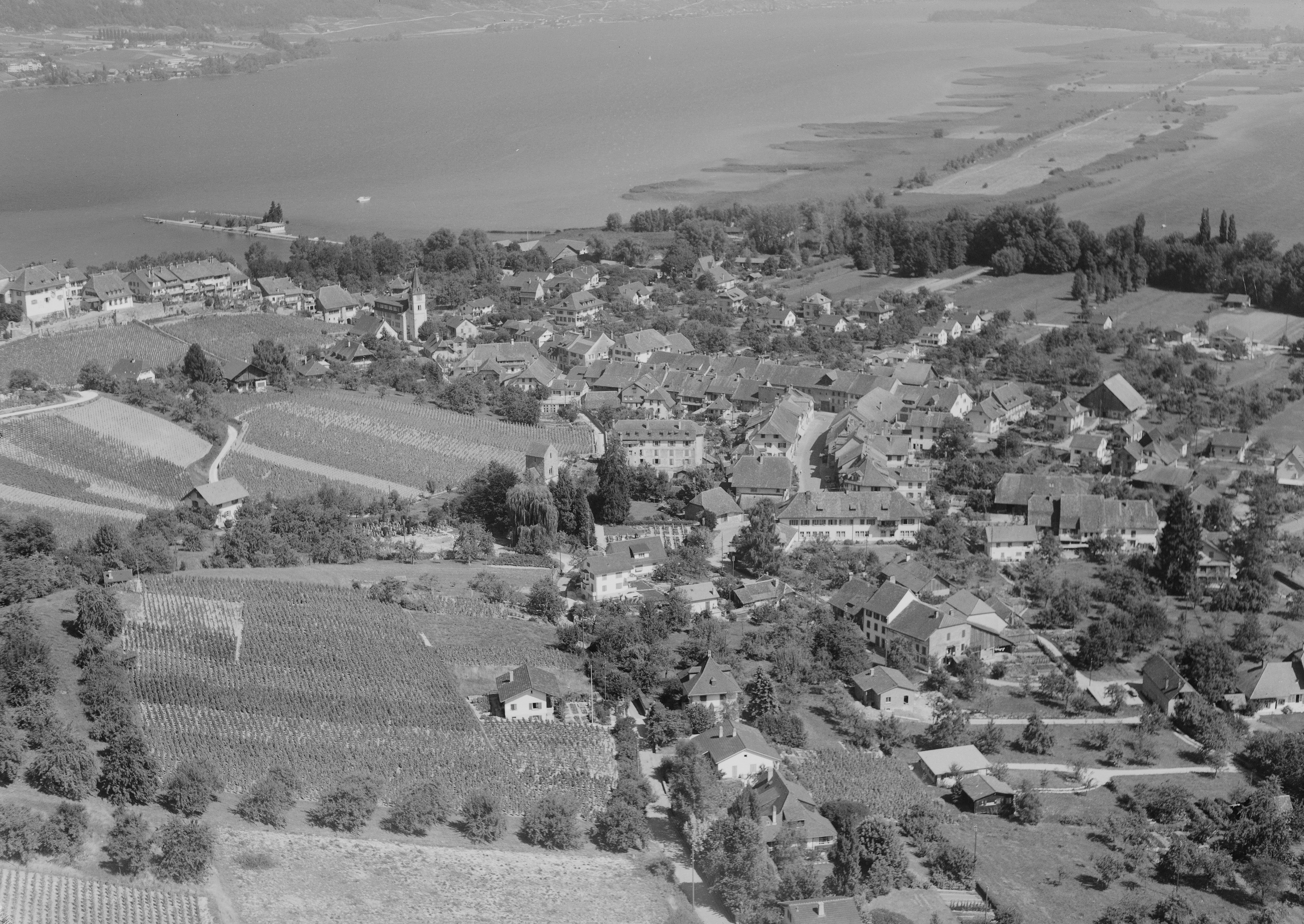
Aerial view (1962)

The nearby Jolimont hills, a 4 km (2.5 mi) long range of hills, have been nearly constantly inhabited for thousands of years. In 1847, three grave mounds from the Middle Bronze Age were excavated. The graves dated to the mid 2nd millennium BC and contained numerous grave goods and weapons. Other graves have been discovered from the Hallstatt era, around 500 BC. A Roman road runs along the southern foot of the hills, between Lake Biel and the town of Petinesca (now Studen).

Erlach is first mentioned in 1185 as Erilacho and in 1274 as Cellie. In French it is called Cerlier. In 1264/66 Erlach received a Handfeste or document of rights from Count Rudolf II of Neuchâtel-Nidau. The village of Sunkort's church was built and consecrated in the 11th century. Around 1100 the Benedictine Erlach Abbey was founded on Saint Peter's Island (actually a peninsula). During the 14th century, the city walls were built. The only remaining city gate, currently part of the Rathaus or town hall, is from this era. Towers were added to the walls in the 15th century. In 1455 the citizens of Erlach founded a hospital. Based on the rights granted by Rudolf II, Erlach had a mayor and until 1798 a 12-member town council with a 6–18 member advisory body.

Portions of Erlach Castle were built in the Middle Ages, but the western main tower was built around 1500. In 1848, during the foundation of the Federal State, Erlach Castle became the district seat. However, thirty years later in 1874, it became a school.

Erlach became a market town in 1367, when it was granted the right to hold a weekly market along with two yearly fairs. During the 19th century, the number of yearly fairs increased to four. The town's economy was diverse and included agriculture, vineyards on the sunny south-facing hillsides, fishing and transportation on Lake Biel. During the 19th century, the watch industry provided many jobs.

The Jura water correction projects of 1874–82 and 1962–72 lowered the water level in the lake and expanded Erlach's shoreline.

== Geography ==
In the old town of Erlach

Erlach has an area of 3.49 km^{2} (1.35 sq mi). Of this area, 1.54 km^{2} (0.59 mi^{2}) or 43.9% is used for agricultural purposes, while 0.97 km^{2} (0.37 mi^{2}) or 27.6% is forested. Of the rest of the land, 0.53 km^{2} (0.20 mi^{2}) or 15.1% is settled (buildings or roads), 0.01 km^{2} (2.5 acres) or 0.3% is either rivers or lakes and 0.4 km^{2} (0.15 mi^{2}) or 11.4% is unproductive land.

Of the built up area, housing and buildings made up 8.5% and transportation infrastructure made up 2.8%. while parks, green belts and sports fields made up 2.8%. Out of the forested land, all of the forested land area is covered with heavy forests. Of the agricultural land, 33.0% is used for growing crops and 5.7% is pastures, while 5.1% is used for orchards or vine crops. All the water in the municipality is in lakes.

Erlach is located on Lake Biel at 433 m (1,421 ft) above sea level. The highest point in Erlach is Jolimont, which is 603 m (1,978 ft) above sea level. The municipality includes the castle, as well as the old city, the market, part of St. Peter's Island, the newer city along the lake shoreline, the village Sunkort, and the exclave Wald on Jolimont mountain.

Erlach was the capital of the Amtsbezirk Erlach until 31 December 2009 when the district was dissolved. On the following day, 1 January 2010, it joined the newly created Verwaltungskreis Seeland.

== Coat of arms ==
The blazon of the municipal coat of arms is Gules an Alder Tree eradicated Or leaved Vert between a Crescent and a Mullet of the second.

== Demographics ==
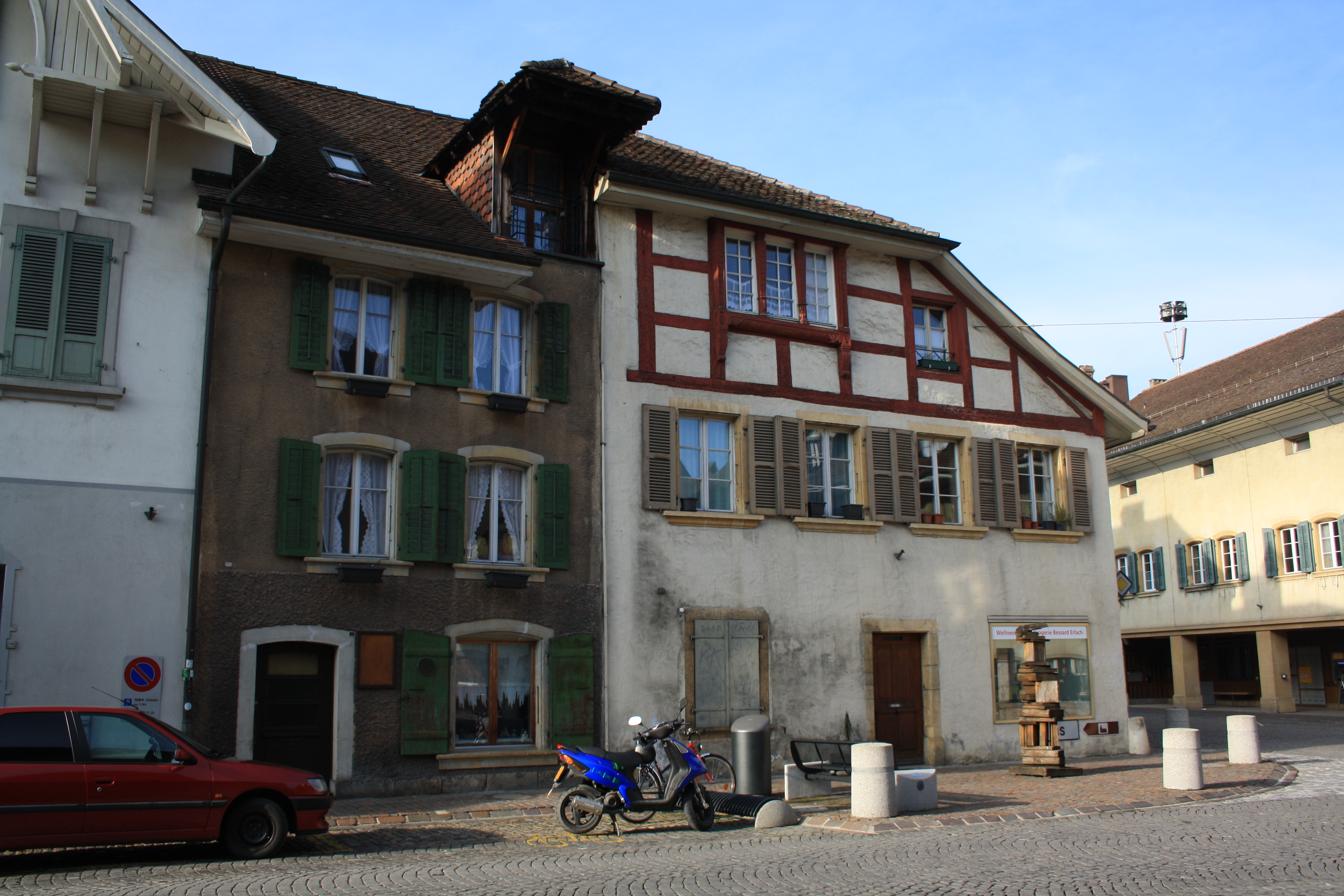
Houses in Erlach's old town

Erlach has a population (as of December 2020) of 1,386. As of 2010, 12.6% of the population were resident foreign nationals. Over the last 10 years (2000–2010) the population has changed at a rate of 14%. Migration accounted for 13.3%, while births and deaths accounted for 0.6%.

Most of the population (as of 2000) speaks German (1,006 or 89.6%) as their first language, French is the second most common (41 or 3.7%) and Albanian is the third (21 or 1.9%). There are 8 people who speak Italian.

As of 2008, the population was 48.0% male and 52.0% female. The population was made up of 519 Swiss men (41.7% of the population) and 78 (6.3%) non-Swiss men. There were 569 Swiss women (45.7%) and 7 (0.6%) non-Swiss women. Of the population in the municipality, 278 or about 24.8% were born in Erlach and lived there in 2000. There were 433 or 38.6% who were born in the same canton, while 198 or 17.6% were born somewhere else in Switzerland, and 162 or 14.4% were born outside of Switzerland.

As of 2010, children and teenagers (0–19 years old) made up 20.6% of the population, while adults (20–64 years old) made up 61.8% and seniors (over 64 years old) made up 17.6%.

As of 2000, there were 485 people who were single and never married in the municipality. There were 515 married individuals, 55 widows or widowers, and 68 individuals who were divorced.

As of 2000, there were 152 households that consist of only one person and 28 households with five or more people. In 2000, a total of 463 apartments (80.0% of the total) were permanently occupied, while 80 apartments (13.8%) were seasonally occupied and 36 apartments (6.2%) were empty. The vacancy rate for the municipality, in 2011, was 1.56%.

The historical population is given in the following chart:

== Sights ==
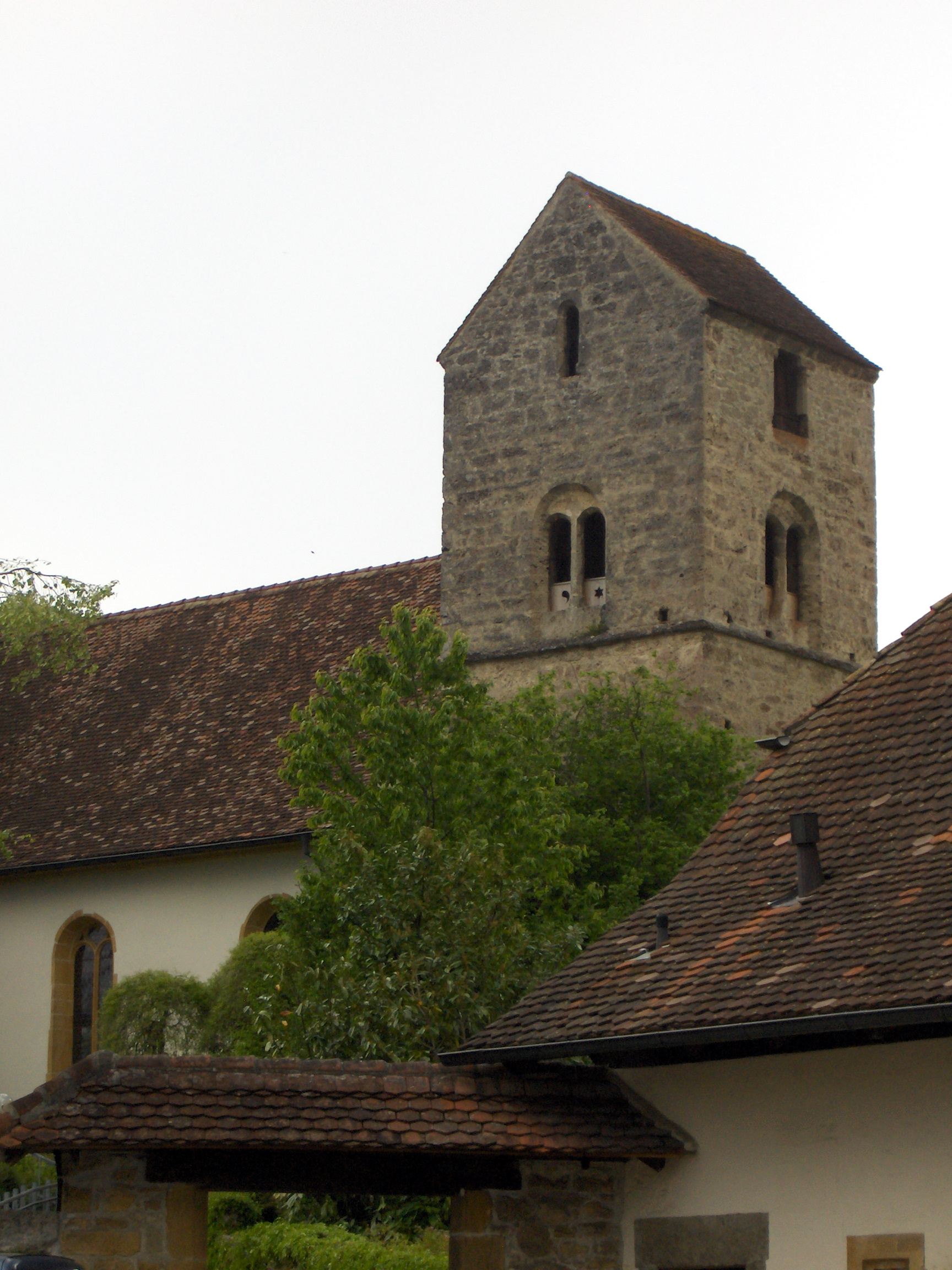
Ulrich Church in the hamlet of Sunkort

The highest point in Erlach is Jolimont which is 603 m (1,978 ft) above sea level. The mountain provides an excellent view of the lake.

The Sankt-Petersinsel (St. Peter Island), really a peninsula, can be reached from Erlach by foot or by bicycle. While Erlach Abbey on the Island is not technically part of the Erlach (it is actually part of Gals) it can be reached easily from Erlach. However, it is now a detention centre for male adults.

The Ulrich Church in Sunkort is supposed to have been consecrated by Saint Ulrich of Zell in the 11th century. It was the private church of the Counts of Fenis in the village Sunkort. The choir tower dates from the 15th century. The massive nave was completely rebuilt in the 17th century.

=== Heritage sites of national significance ===
The Rathaus (Town council house) and Erlach Castle are listed as Swiss heritage site of national significance. The entire old town of Erlach is part of the Inventory of Swiss Heritage Sites.

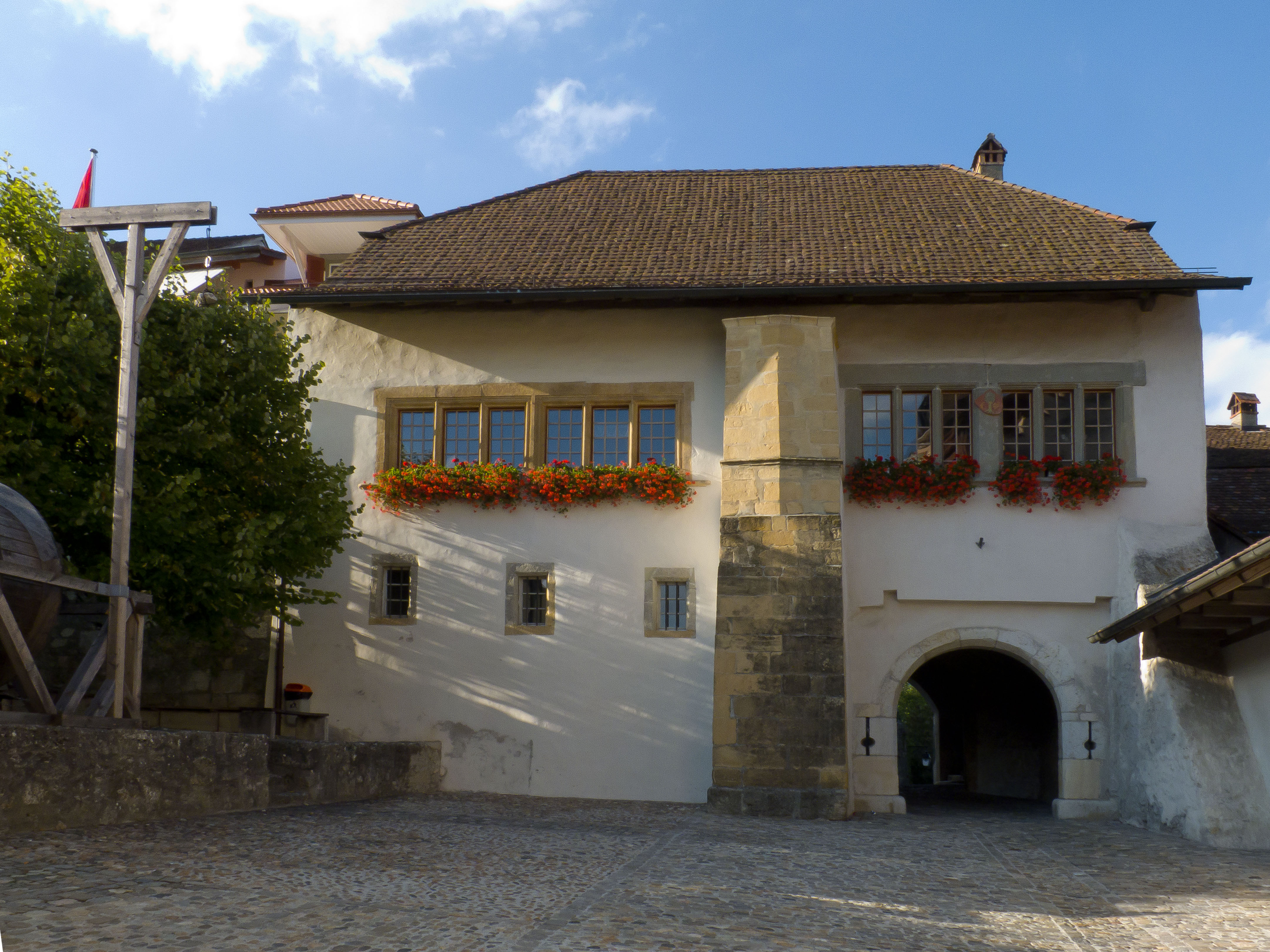
Town council house

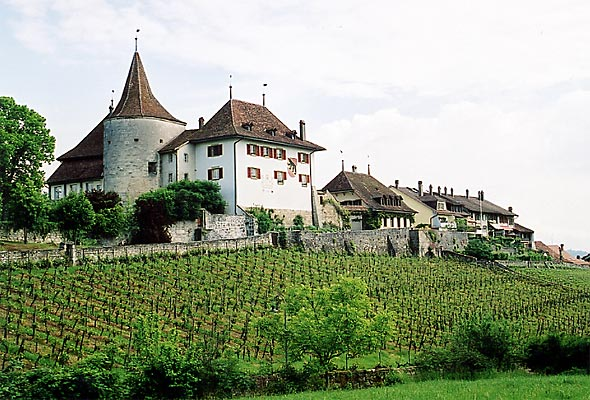
Erlach Castle

Old town an St. Peter's Island

== Politics ==
In the 2011 federal election the most popular party was the Swiss People's Party (SVP) which received 22.5% of the vote. The next three most popular parties were the Social Democratic Party (SP) (19.2%), the Conservative Democratic Party (BDP) (15.9%) and the Green Party (12.9%). In the federal election, a total of 514 votes were cast, and the voter turnout was 54.3%.

== Economy ==
As of 2011, Erlach had an unemployment rate of 1.26%. As of 2008, there were a total of 422 people employed in the municipality. Of these, there were 40 people employed in the primary economic sector and about 11 businesses involved in this sector. 120 people were employed in the secondary sector and there were 10 businesses in this sector. 262 people were employed in the tertiary sector, with 55 businesses in this sector. There were 582 residents of the municipality who were employed in some capacity, of which females made up 43.3% of the workforce.

In 2008, there were a total of 331 full-time equivalent jobs. The number of jobs in the primary sector was 24, all of which were in agriculture. The number of jobs in the secondary sector was 107 of which 75 or (70.1%) were in manufacturing and 32 (29.9%) were in construction. The number of jobs in the tertiary sector was 200. In the tertiary sector; 50 or 25.0% were in wholesale or retail sales or the repair of motor vehicles, 39 or 19.5% were in a hotel or restaurant, 5 or 2.5% were the insurance or financial industry, 7 or 3.5% were technical professionals or scientists, 17 or 8.5% were in education and 43 or 21.5% were in health care.

In 2000, there were 217 workers who commuted into the municipality and 334 workers who commuted away. The municipality is a net exporter of workers, with about 1.5 workers leaving the municipality for every one entering. Of the working population, 15.3% used public transportation to get to work, and 42.4% used a private car.

== Religion ==
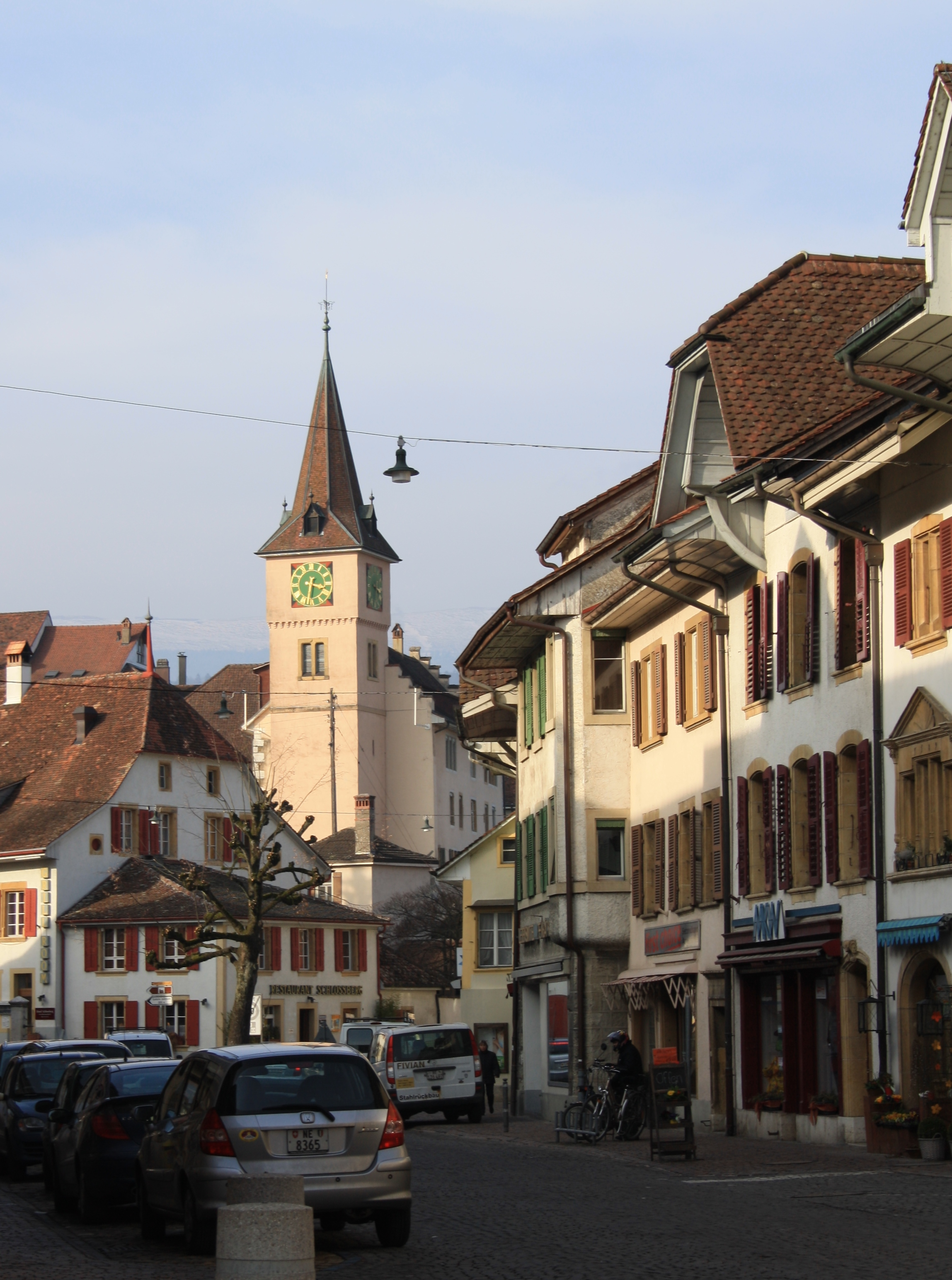
Erlach's old town and church

From the 2000 census, 166 or 14.8% were Roman Catholic, while 739 or 65.8% belonged to the Swiss Reformed Church. Of the rest of the population, there were 4 members of an Orthodox church (or about 0.36% of the population), and there were 37 individuals (or about 3.29% of the population) who belonged to another Christian church. There were 27 (or about 2.40% of the population) who were Islamic. There were 5 individuals who were Buddhist. 109 (or about 9.71% of the population) belonged to no church, are agnostic or atheist, and 54 individuals (or about 4.81% of the population) did not answer the question.

== Education ==
In Erlach about 424 or (37.8%) of the population have completed non-mandatory upper secondary education, and 153 or (13.6%) have completed additional higher education (either university or a Fachhochschule). Of the 153 who completed tertiary schooling, 60.8% were Swiss men, 29.4% were Swiss women, 6.5% were non-Swiss men and 3.3% were non-Swiss women.

The Canton of Bern school system provides one year of non-obligatory Kindergarten, followed by six years of Primary school. This is followed by three years of obligatory lower Secondary school where the students are separated according to ability and aptitude. Following the lower Secondary students may attend additional schooling or they may enter an apprenticeship.

During the 2010–11 school year, there were a total of 227 students attending classes in Erlach. There was one kindergarten class with a total of 21 students in the municipality. Of the kindergarten students, 23.8% were permanent or temporary residents of Switzerland (not citizens) and 14.3% have a different mother language than the classroom language. The municipality had 3 primary classes and 63 students. Of the primary students, 19.0% were permanent or temporary residents of Switzerland (not citizens) and 14.3% have a different mother language than the classroom language. During the same year, there were 6 lower secondary classes with a total of 120 students. There were 3.3% who were permanent or temporary residents of Switzerland (not citizens) and 8.3% have a different mother language than the classroom language. As of 2000, there were 106 students in Erlach who came from another municipality, while 44 residents attended schools outside the municipality.

Erlach is home to the Stedtlibibliothek Erlach library. The library has (as of 2008) 5,748 books or other media, and loaned out 16,542 items in the same year. It was open a total of 154 days with average of 7 hours per week during that year.

== Notable residents ==
The Bernese patrician surname von Erlach goes back to the locality (see Erlacherhof and Sigmund von Erlach). There are also several localities in Austria known as Erlach, from which some of the Austrian and Italian von Erlach families may have come.

and

- Karl Scheurer (1872–1929) was a Swiss politician, President of the Swiss Confederation in 1923
- Werner Günthör (born 1961) a Swiss former track and field athlete, bronze medallist in the shot put at the 1988 Summer Olympics, lives in Erlach
