= Lake Biel =

Lake in western Switzerland

- Lake Bienne; Bielersee (German); Lac de Bienne (French)
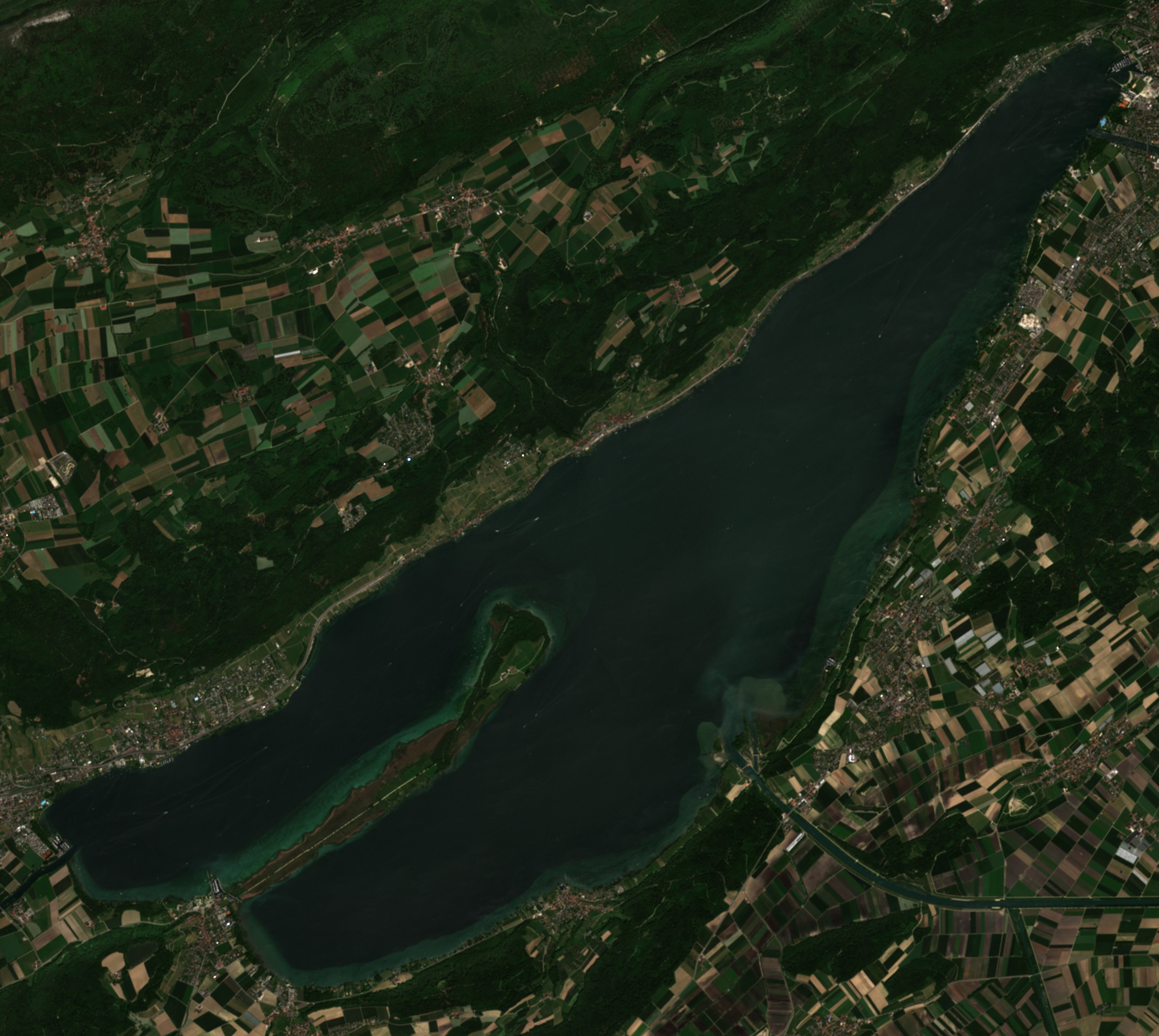

- Location within Canton of Bern Location within Canton of Neuchâtel Location within Switzerland Location within Alps
- Interactive map of Lake Biel
- Location: Canton of Bern
- Coordinates: 47°5′N 7°10′E
- Catchment area: 8,305 km^{2} (3,207 sq mi)
- Basin countries: Switzerland
- Max. length: 15 km (9.3 mi)
- Max. width: 4.1 km (2.5 mi)
- Surface area: 39.3 km^{2} (15.2 sq mi)
- Max. depth: 74 m (243 ft)
- Water volume: 1.12 km^{3} (910,000 acre⋅ft)
- Residence time: 58 days
- Surface elevation: 429 m (1,407 ft)
- Islands: St. Peter's Island
- Settlements: Biel/Bienne (see list)

Lake Biel or Lake Bienne (German: Bielersee [ˈbiːlərzeː]; French: Lac de Bienne [lak də bjɛn]) is a lake in western Switzerland. Together with Lake Morat and Lake Neuchâtel, it is one of the three large lakes in the Jura Mountains region of Switzerland. It lies on the language boundary between German and French speaking areas.

== Geography ==
The lake is 15 km long and up to 4.1 km wide. Its surface area is 39.3 km^{2}, the maximum depth 74 m. The lake is located at 429 metres above sea level.

Lake Biel/Bienne has a catchment area of about 8,305 km^{2}. Water remains in the lake for an average of 58 days. The rivers Aare and Zihl/Thielle flowing from Lake Neuchâtel, the Twannbach draining water down from the surplombing first Jura mountain range and the Suze draining water down from the Vallon de St. Imier, are the main tributaries. The Aare was redirected into the lake in 1878, in order to prevent the flooding of the nearby area called "Seeland", and drains the water out of the lake down to Büren through a simultaneously man-made channel. The level of all three lakes is being controlled by a dam built across the channel, in Port.

The lake contains the Île de St Pierre, where Rousseau resided for a short time in 1765.

Many traces of lake-dwellings have been discovered on the shores of the lake. Today, the largest settlement along the shores of Lake Biel are the bilingual city of Biel/Bienne and its sister city Nidau, both located on the northern end. The St. Peter's Island attracts tourists. The island is located near Erlach/Cerlier. Jean-Jacques Rousseau once spent a few months on the island.

One of the main business in the area is the watch and affiliated microtechnic industries. World famous watch brands have their sites and headquarters in the area, including the Swatch Group and Rolex movements manufacture.

The lake's surface is the lowest point of the canton of Neuchâtel.

== Towns and villages by the lake ==
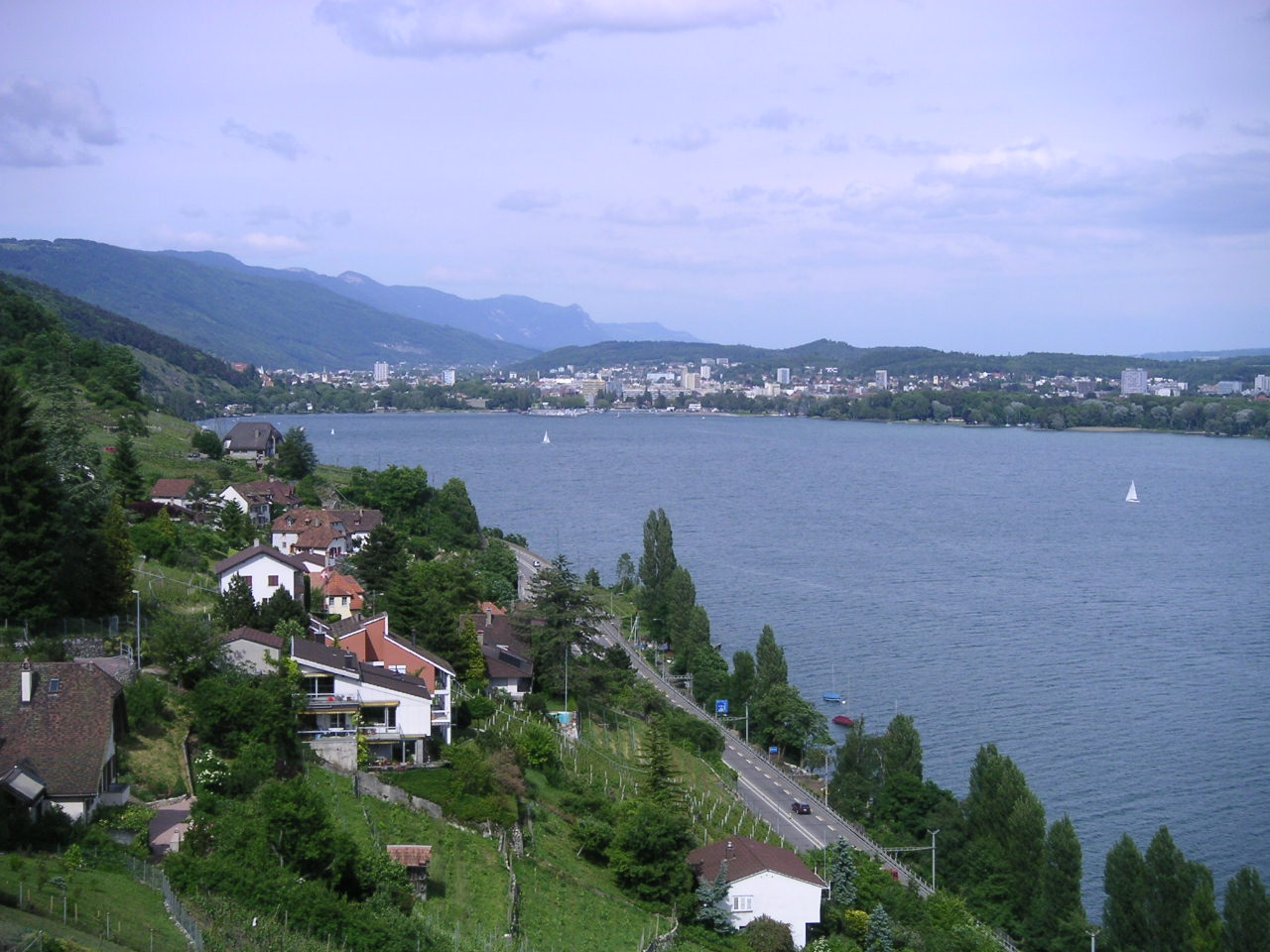
The lake at Alfermée with the view of Biel/Bienne and Nidau

As the lake is located on the border of the French and German language regions, most places have names in both languages, though not all versions are still in use.

- Alfermée
- Bipschal - Bévesier
- Erlach - Cerlier
- Gaicht - Jugy
- Gerolfingen
- Hagneck
- Im Rusel
- Ipsach
- Le Landeron (canton of Neuchâtel) - Landern
- Ligerz - Gléresse
- Lüscherz - Locras
- Mörigen - Morenges
- Neuenstadt - La Neuveville
- Nidau
- Sankt-Petersinsel
- Schafis - Chavanne
- Schernelz - Cernaux
- Sutz-Lattrigen
- Täuffelen - Choufaille
- Tüscherz - Daucher
- Twann - Douanne
- Vinelz - Fénil
- Vingelz - Vigneules
- Wingreis - Vingras
