= Wallenbuch =

Former municipality, canton of Fribourg

- Former municipality
- Location of Wallenbuch
- Location within Switzerland Location within Canton of Fribourg
- Coordinates: 46.9297°N 7.22472°E
- Country: Switzerland
- Canton: Fribourg
- District: See
- Municipality: Gurmels

Population (2000)
  - Total: 109
- Time zone: UTC+01:00 (CET)
  - Summer (DST): UTC+02:00 (CEST)
- ISO 3166 code: CH-FR
- Website

Wallenbuch is a former municipality in the See district of the canton of Fribourg, Switzerland. Since 2003 it has been part of the municipality of Gurmels, together with Liebistorf and Guschelmuth. Wallenbuch consists of a hamlet with a chapel, a chaplaincy, a schoolhouse and several farms (14 in 1818, 8 in 1917), and is the only German-speaking Fribourg enclave in the Bernese district of Laupen. It lies away from the larger through roads and has no public transport connection.

== History ==
Wallenbuch is first mentioned in 1306 as Buch and in 1340 as Valabuch. A Roman site from the 1st century lies south of the village. From 1502 Fribourg acquired the lordship rights; it agreed a boundary adjustment with Bern in 1507 and set up a small bailiwick (Landvogtei), administered by the state chancery (in the 18th century by the weighmaster, Waagmeister). The commune's statutes date from 1589.

After the Reformation, Wallenbuch was separated from the parish of Ferenbalm and assigned to that of Gurmels. The chapel of Saints Barbara and Radegund already existed in 1470; it was rebuilt in 1599 and thoroughly renovated in 1809–1810. In 1737 a chaplaincy benefice was endowed, whose holder also taught school until 1907. The schoolhouse built that year was used until 1971.

Wallenbuch was assigned to the district of Murten in 1798–1803, to the district of Fribourg in 1803–1830 and to the German district (Deutscher Bezirk) in 1831–1847, and became part of the See district in 1848. It kept its agricultural character until the second half of the 20th century, then developed into a residential municipality for commuters working in Fribourg, Murten and Laupen.

Wallenbuch had 79 inhabitants in 1811, 81 in 1850, 47 in 1900, 62 in 1950 and 109 in 2000.

== Bibliography ==
- Die Kunstdenkmäler des Kantons Freiburg, vol. 5, 2000, pp. 434–438
