= Kleinbösingen =

- Municipality
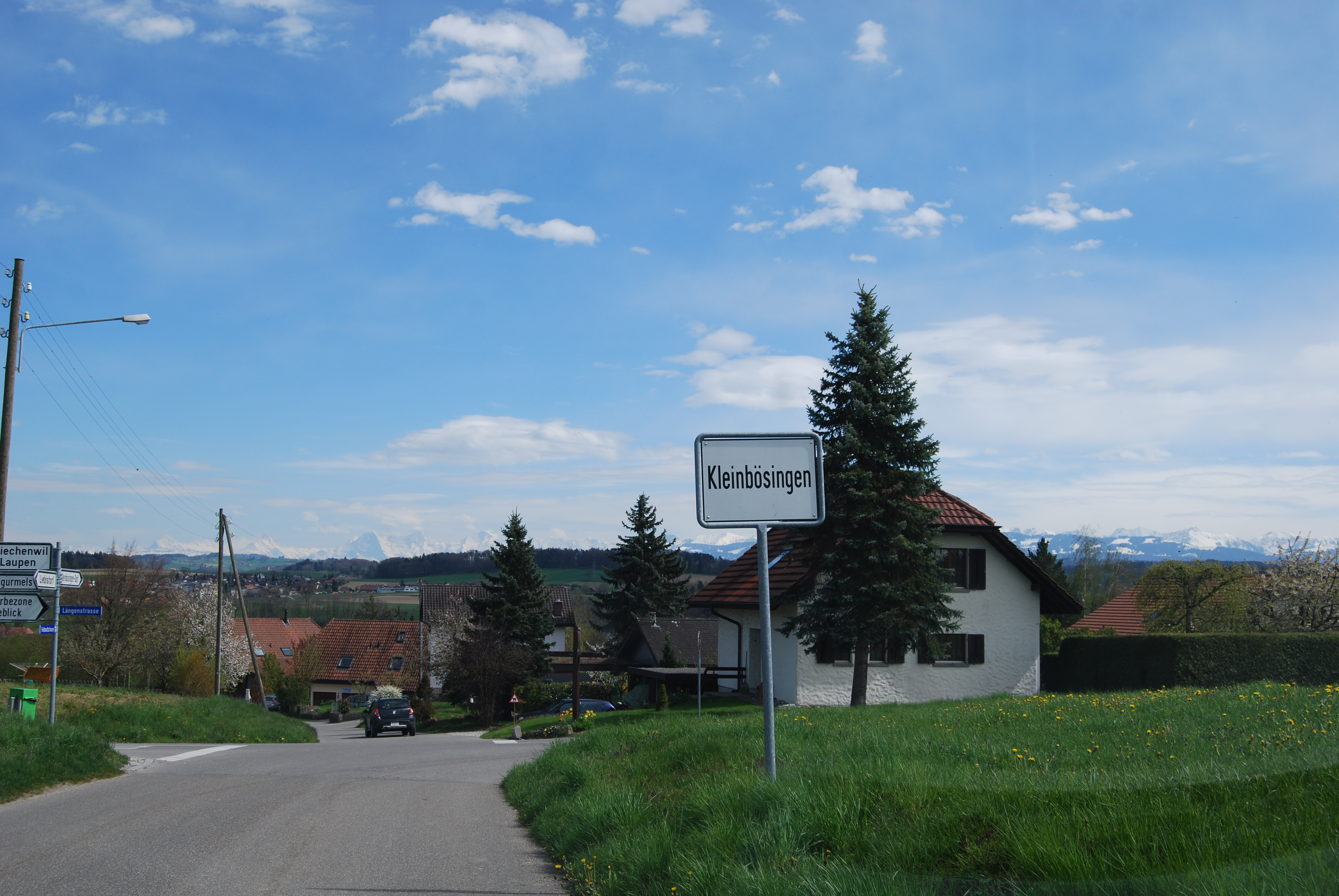

- Coat of arms
- Location of Kleinbösingen
- Location within Switzerland Location within Canton of Fribourg
- Coordinates: 46°54′N 7°12′E
- Country: Switzerland
- Canton: Fribourg
- District: See

Government
  - Executive: Gemeinderat with 5 members
  - Mayor: Ammann

Area
  - Total: 3.01 km^{2} (1.16 sq mi)
- Elevation: 509 m (1,670 ft)

Population (December 2020)
  - Total: 699
  - Density: 232/km^{2} (601/sq mi)
- Time zone: UTC+01:00 (CET)
  - Summer (DST): UTC+02:00 (CEST)
- Postal code: 3213
- SFOS number: 2266
- ISO 3166 code: CH-FR
- Surrounded by: Bösingen, Düdingen, Gurmels, Kriechenwil (BE)
- Website: www.kleinboesingen.ch

Kleinbösingen is a municipality in the district of See in the canton of Fribourg in Switzerland. Its former French name was Petit-Basens. It is one of the municipalities with a large majority of German speakers in the mostly French speaking Canton of Fribourg.

== History ==
Kleinbösingen is first mentioned in 1264 as Balsingen lo pitet. In 1264-65 it was mentioned as Besingen, in 1584 as Zänerbösingen and until the 18th century as Welschbösingen.

== Geography ==
Kleinbösingen has an area of 3.02 km^{2} (1.17 sq mi). Of this area, 1.95 km^{2} (0.75 mi^{2}) or 64.8% is used for agricultural purposes, while 0.63 km^{2} (0.24 mi^{2}) or 20.9% is forested. Of the rest of the land, 0.28 km^{2} (0.11 mi^{2}) or 9.3% is settled (buildings or roads), 0.08 km^{2} (20 acres) or 2.7% is either rivers or lakes and 0.07 km^{2} (17 acres) or 2.3% is unproductive land.

Of the built up area, housing and buildings made up 4.7% and transportation infrastructure made up 4.0%. Out of the forested land, 15.6% of the total land area is heavily forested and 5.3% is covered with orchards or small clusters of trees. Of the agricultural land, 52.8% is used for growing crops and 10.3% is pastures, while 1.7% is used for orchards or vine crops. Of the water in the municipality, 1.7% is in lakes and 1.0% is in rivers and streams.

The municipality is located in the See district, on the left bank of the Saane/Sarine river and on the end of the Schiffenensee between Murten and Fribourg.

== Coat of arms ==
The blazon of the municipal coat of arms is Per fess Gules an Bull passant proper and Argent a Ploughshare Azure in band.

== Demographics ==
Kleinbösingen has a population (as of December 2020) of 699. As of 2008, 7.1% of the population are resident foreign nationals. Over the last 10 years (2000–2010) the population has changed at a rate of 15%. Migration accounted for 14.4%, while births and deaths accounted for 3%.

Most of the population (as of 2000) speaks German (480 or 94.9%) as their first language, French is the second most common (15 or 3.0%) and Italian is the third (6 or 1.2%).

As of 2008, the population was 49.8% male and 50.2% female. The population was made up of 264 Swiss men (46.2% of the population) and 21 (3.7%) non-Swiss men. There were 271 Swiss women (47.4%) and 16 (2.8%) non-Swiss women. Of the population in the municipality, 139 or about 27.5% were born in Kleinbösingen and lived there in 2000. There were 135 or 26.7% who were born in the same canton, while 177 or 35.0% were born somewhere else in Switzerland, and 36 or 7.1% were born outside of Switzerland.

As of 2000, children and teenagers (0–19 years old) make up 26.3% of the population, while adults (20–64 years old) make up 66.6% and seniors (over 64 years old) make up 7.1%.

As of 2000, there were 218 people who were single and never married in the municipality. There were 244 married individuals, 23 widows or widowers and 21 individuals who are divorced.

As of 2000, there were 181 private households in the municipality, and an average of 2.8 persons per household. There were 39 households that consist of only one person and 17 households with five or more people. In 2000, a total of 174 apartments (93.0% of the total) were permanently occupied, while 10 apartments (5.3%) were seasonally occupied and 3 apartments (1.6%) were empty. As of 2009, the construction rate of new housing units was 3.5 new units per 1000 residents. The vacancy rate for the municipality, in 2010, was 0.45%.

The historical population is given in the following chart:

== Politics ==
In the 2011 federal election the most popular party was the SVP which received 29.6% of the vote. The next three most popular parties were the SPS (18.8%), the CVP (18.1%) and the FDP (8.1%).

The SVP received about the same percentage of the vote as they did in the 2007 Federal election (25.9% in 2007 vs 29.6% in 2011). The SPS moved from third in 2007 (with 16.1%) to second in 2011, the CVP moved from second in 2007 (with 23.6%) to third and the FDP moved from below fourth place in 2007 to fourth. A total of 209 votes were cast in this election, of which 4 or 1.9% were invalid.

== Economy ==
As of 2010, Kleinbösingen had an unemployment rate of 1.1%. As of 2008, there were 19 people employed in the primary economic sector and about 8 businesses involved in this sector. 29 people were employed in the secondary sector and there were 9 businesses in this sector. 37 people were employed in the tertiary sector, with 15 businesses in this sector. There were 293 residents of the municipality who were employed in some capacity, of which females made up 41.6% of the workforce.

In 2008 the total number of full-time equivalent jobs was 67. The number of jobs in the primary sector was 13, all of which were in agriculture. The number of jobs in the secondary sector was 27 of which 7 or (25.9%) were in manufacturing and 9 (33.3%) were in construction. The number of jobs in the tertiary sector was 27. In the tertiary sector; 16 or 59.3% were in wholesale or retail sales or the repair of motor vehicles, 1 was in the movement and storage of goods, 1 was in the information industry, 4 or 14.8% were technical professionals or scientists.

In 2000, there were 21 workers who commuted into the municipality and 239 workers who commuted away. The municipality is a net exporter of workers, with about 11.4 workers leaving the municipality for every one entering. Of the working population, 10.2% used public transportation to get to work, and 74.4% used a private car.

== Religion ==
From the 2000 census, 257 or 50.8% were Roman Catholic, while 177 or 35.0% belonged to the Swiss Reformed Church. Of the rest of the population, there were 24 individuals (or about 4.74% of the population) who belonged to another Christian church. There was 1 individual who was Islamic. There was 1 person who was Buddhist and 1 person who was Hindu. 41 (or about 8.10% of the population) belonged to no church, are agnostic or atheist, and 16 individuals (or about 3.16% of the population) did not answer the question.

== Education ==
In Kleinbösingen about 196 or (38.7%) of the population have completed non-mandatory upper secondary education, and 67 or (13.2%) have completed additional higher education (either university or a Fachhochschule). Of the 67 who completed tertiary schooling, 74.6% were Swiss men, 14.9% were Swiss women.

The Canton of Fribourg school system provides one year of non-obligatory Kindergarten, followed by six years of Primary school. This is followed by three years of obligatory lower Secondary school where the students are separated according to ability and aptitude. Following the lower Secondary students may attend a three or four year optional upper Secondary school. The upper Secondary school is divided into gymnasium (university preparatory) and vocational programs. After they finish the upper Secondary program, students may choose to attend a Tertiary school or continue their apprenticeship.

During the 2010-11 school year, there were no students attending school in Kleinbösingen, but a total of 86 students attended school in other municipalities. Of these students, 13 were in kindergarten, 33 were in a primary school, 19 were in a mandatory secondary school, 9 were in an upper secondary school and 9 were in a vocational secondary program. There were a total of 3 tertiary students from Kleinbösingen.

As of 2000, there were 90 students from Kleinbösingen who attended schools outside the municipality.
