= Monterschu =

Former municipality, canton of Fribourg

- Former municipality
- Location of Monterschu
- Location within Switzerland Location within Canton of Fribourg
- Coordinates: 46.88333°N 7.166669°E
- Country: Switzerland
- Canton: Fribourg
- District: See
- Municipality: Gurmels

Population (1970)
  - Total: 46
- Time zone: UTC+01:00 (CET)
  - Summer (DST): UTC+02:00 (CEST)
- SFOS number: 2273
- ISO 3166 code: CH-FR
- Website

Monterschu is a hamlet and former municipality in the See district of the canton of Fribourg, Switzerland, about 15 km north of Fribourg. Since 1978 it has been part of the municipality of Gurmels.

== History ==
Monterschu is first mentioned in 1232 as Moncorsum and in 1363 as Monterschun. In 1363 it was owned by the counts of Thierstein, whose fiefs Fribourg acquired in 1442. Monterschu has always belonged to the parish of Gurmels. Until 1798 it was part of Fribourg's Alte Landschaft (Old Territory), in the Hospital banner (Spitalpanner). It was assigned to the district of Murten in 1798–1803, to the district of Fribourg in 1803–1830 and to the German district (Deutscher Bezirk) in 1831–1847, and became part of the See district in 1848.

The Fegely manor house dates from the middle of the 18th century. Under a provision in the will of Maria Fegely, it was converted into a home for orphans from the parishes of Barberêche and Gurmels. The Baldegg Sisters (Baldegger Schwestern) ran the home and its farm from 1909 until it closed in 1961. In 2000 there were five farms in Monterschu.

Monterschu had 58 inhabitants in 1811, 105 in 1831, 105 in 1850, 93 in 1900, 95 in 1950 and 46 in 1970.

== Bibliography ==
- Freiburger Nachrichten, 6 August 1981
- H. Vonlanthen, "Zur Entstehungsgeschichte des Sensebezirks", in Beiträge zur Heimatkunde des Sensebezirks, 52, 1982/83, pp. 295–319
- Der Seebezirk, 2000, p. 56
- Die Kunstdenkmäler des Kantons Freiburg, vol. 5, 2000, pp. 366–367
