= Kriechenwil =

- Municipality
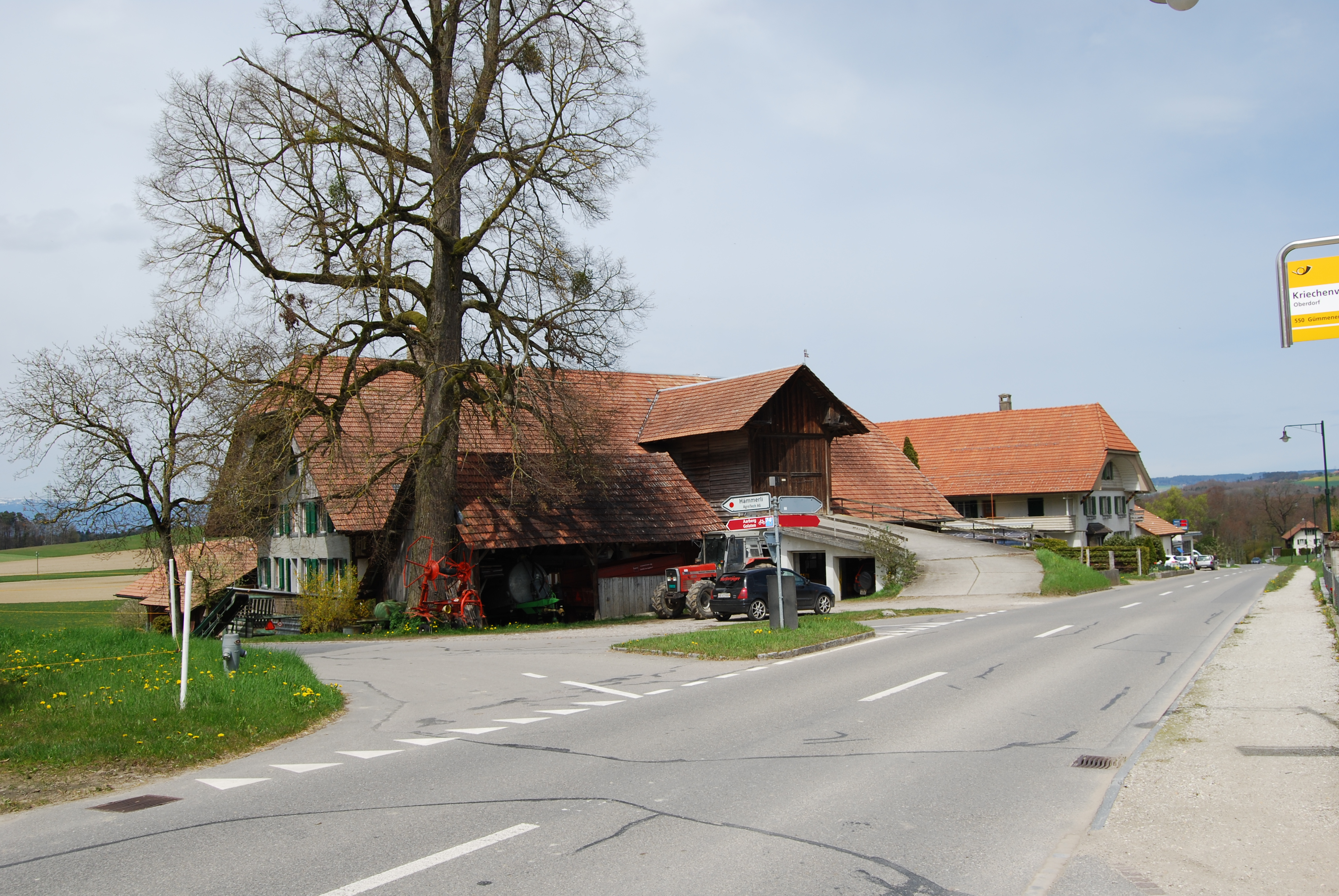

- Flag Coat of arms
- Location of Kriechenwil
- Location within Switzerland Location within Canton of Bern
- Coordinates: 46°54′N 7°13′E
- Country: Switzerland
- Canton: Bern
- District: Bern-Mittelland

Government
  - Executive: Gemeinderat with 5 members
  - Mayor: Gemeindepräsident; Simon Fankhauser (as of 2026)

Area
  - Total: 4.8 km^{2} (1.9 sq mi)
- Elevation: 530 m (1,740 ft)

Population (December 2020)
  - Total: 441
  - Density: 92/km^{2} (240/sq mi)
- Time zone: UTC+01:00 (CET)
  - Summer (DST): UTC+02:00 (CEST)
- Postal code: 3179
- SFOS number: 666
- ISO 3166 code: CH-BE
- Surrounded by: Bösingen (FR), Ferenbalm, Gurmels (FR), Kleinbösingen, Laupen, Ulmiz (FR)
- Website: www.kriechenwil.ch

Kriechenwil is a municipality in the Bern-Mittelland administrative district in the canton of Bern in Switzerland.

== History ==
Kriechenwil is first mentioned in 1353 as Digki. Until 1959 the official name was Dicki.

Prehistoric traces of settlements in the area include a Neolithic spearhead, a Hallstatt grave mound, an early medieval bridle and saddle and a cache of unknown coins. The land that is now the modern municipality was part of the medieval Herrschaft of Laupen. In 1324, the entire Herrschaft was acquired by Bern. The village may have existed before it became Bernese territory, but there are no records before 1353. A bridge was built over the Sarine river around 1400 as part of a medieval trade road to Bern.

The village was part of the parish of Neuenegg until the Protestant Reformation in 1528. After adopting the new faith, it became part of the parish of Laupen.

Today the municipality has its own primary school, while students travel to Laupen for secondary education. About two-thirds of the working population commutes to jobs in nearby towns.

== Geography ==
Kriechenwil has an area of 4.74 km^{2} (1.83 sq mi). As of 2012, a total of 2.59 km^{2} (1.00 mi^{2}) or 54.5% is used for agricultural purposes, while 1.9 km^{2} (0.73 mi^{2}) or 40.0% is forested. Of the rest of the land, 0.26 km^{2} (0.10 mi^{2}) or 5.5% is settled (buildings or roads), 0.01 km^{2} (2.5 acres) or 0.2% is either rivers or lakes.

During the same year, housing and buildings made up 2.1% and transportation infrastructure made up 2.9%. Out of the forested land, all of the forested land area is covered with heavy forests. Of the agricultural land, 42.1% is used for growing crops and 10.7% is pastures, while 1.7% is used for orchards or vine crops. All the water in the municipality is flowing water.

It lies on the river Saane in the central Swiss Plateau on the border with the Canton of Fribourg. It includes the village of Kriechenwil and the hamlets of Schönenbühl and Risau.

On 31 December 2009 Amtsbezirk Laupen, the municipality's former district, was dissolved. On the following day, 1 January 2010, it joined the newly created Verwaltungskreis Bern-Mittelland.

== Coat of arms ==
The blazon of the municipal coat of arms is Argent a linden tree eradicated vert dimidiating Azure a triple bar wavy argent fimbriated sable.

== Demographics ==
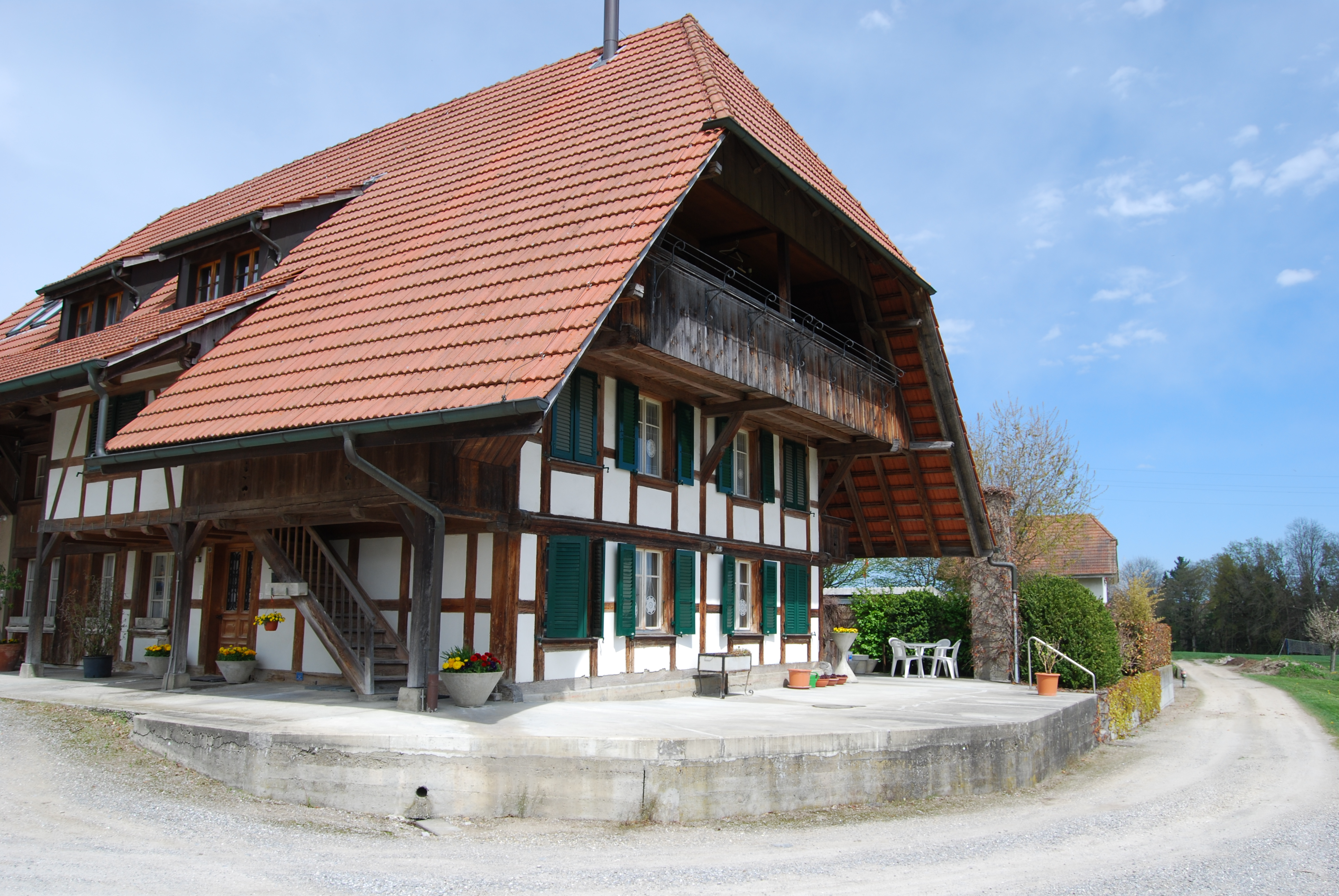
Half-timbered house in Kriechenwil

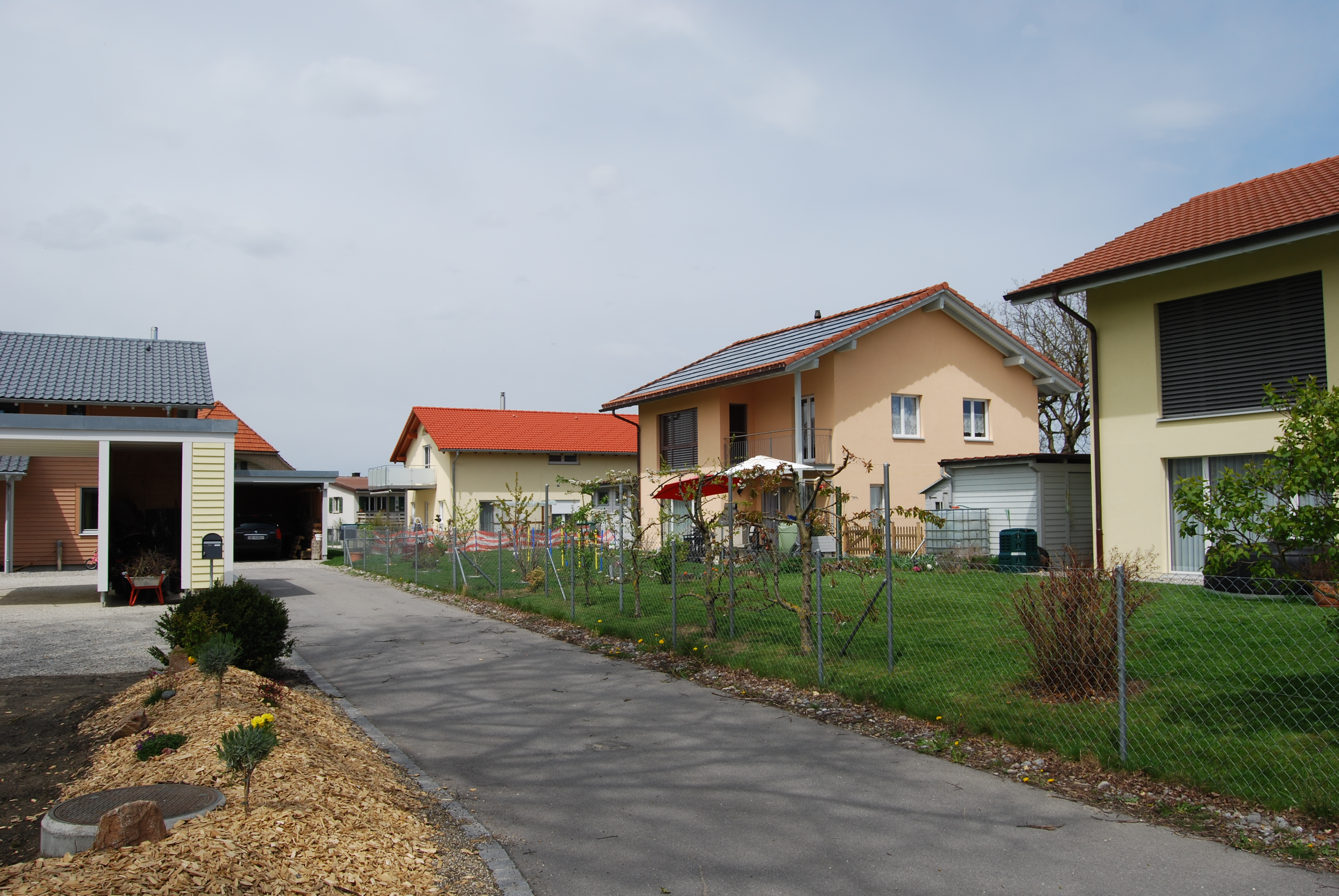
Modern houses in the municipality

Kriechenwil has a population (as of December 2020) of 441. As of 2010, 3.6% of the population are resident foreign nationals. Over the last 10 years (2001-2011) the population has changed at a rate of 0.7%. Migration accounted for 0.5%, while births and deaths accounted for 0%.

Most of the population (as of 2000) speaks German (396 or 96.6%) as their first language, French is the second most common (7 or 1.7%) and one or more African languages was the third (5 or 1.2%).

As of 2008, the population was 53.0% male and 47.0% female. The population was made up of 209 Swiss men (50.9% of the population) and 9 (2.2%) non-Swiss men. There were 187 Swiss women (45.5%) and 6 (1.5%) non-Swiss women. Of the population in the municipality, 149 or about 36.3% were born in Kriechenwil and lived there in 2000. There were 155 or 37.8% who were born in the same canton, while 76 or 18.5% were born somewhere else in Switzerland, and 20 or 4.9% were born outside of Switzerland.

As of 2011, children and teenagers (0–19 years old) make up 18.4% of the population, while adults (20–64 years old) make up 54.8% and seniors (over 64 years old) make up 26.8%.

As of 2000, there were 151 people who were single and never married in the municipality. There were 217 married individuals, 26 widows or widowers and 16 individuals who are divorced.

As of 2010, there were 39 households that consist of only one person and 17 households with five or more people. In 2000, a total of 158 apartments (94.0% of the total) were permanently occupied, while 7 apartments (4.2%) were seasonally occupied and 3 apartments (1.8%) were empty. As of 2010, the construction rate of new housing units was 2.4 new units per 1000 residents.

The historical population is given in the following chart:

== Politics ==
In the 2011 federal election the most popular party was the Swiss People's Party (SVP) which received 32.9% of the vote. The next three most popular parties were the Conservative Democratic Party (BDP) (23.8%), the Social Democratic Party (SP) (12.7%) and the FDP.The Liberals (8.2%). In the federal election, a total of 166 votes were cast, and the voter turnout was 48.4%.

== Economy ==
As of 2011, Kriechenwil had an unemployment rate of 1.05%. As of 2008, there were a total of 114 people employed in the municipality. Of these, there were 57 people employed in the primary economic sector and about 19 businesses involved in this sector. 25 people were employed in the secondary sector and there were 4 businesses in this sector. 32 people were employed in the tertiary sector, with 12 businesses in this sector. There were 204 residents of the municipality who were employed in some capacity, of which females made up 43.6% of the workforce.

In 2008 there were a total of 74 full-time equivalent jobs. The number of jobs in the primary sector was 34, all of which were in agriculture. The number of jobs in the secondary sector was 20 of which 19 or (95.0%) were in manufacturing and 1 was in construction. The number of jobs in the tertiary sector was 20. In the tertiary sector; 6 or 30.0% were in wholesale or retail sales or the repair of motor vehicles, 1 was in the movement and storage of goods, 5 or 25.0% were in a hotel or restaurant, 2 or 10.0% were in education.

In 2000, there were 31 workers who commuted into the municipality and 136 workers who commuted away. The municipality is a net exporter of workers, with about 4.4 workers leaving the municipality for every one entering. A total of 68 workers (68.7% of the 99 total workers in the municipality) both lived and worked in Kriechenwil. Of the working population, 14.2% used public transportation to get to work, and 50% used a private car.

In 2011 the average local and cantonal tax rate on a married resident of Kriechenwil making 150,000 CHF was 12.2%, while an unmarried resident's rate was 17.9%. For comparison, the average rate for the entire canton in 2006 was 13.9% and the nationwide rate was 11.6%. In 2009 there were a total of 194 tax payers in the municipality. Of that total, 45 made over 75,000 CHF per year. There were 2 people who made between 15,000 and 20,000 per year. The greatest number of workers, 57, made between 50 and 75 thousand CHF per year. The average income of the over 75,000 CHF group in Kriechenwil was 118,073 CHF, while the average across all of Switzerland was 130,478 CHF.

== Religion ==
From the 2000 census, 348 or 84.9% belonged to the Swiss Reformed Church, while 32 or 7.8% were Roman Catholic. Of the rest of the population, there were 8 individuals (or about 1.95% of the population) who belonged to another Christian church. There were 6 (or about 1.46% of the population) who were Islamic. There were 2 individuals who were Buddhist. 11 (or about 2.68% of the population) belonged to no church, are agnostic or atheist, and 7 individuals (or about 1.71% of the population) did not answer the question.

== Education ==
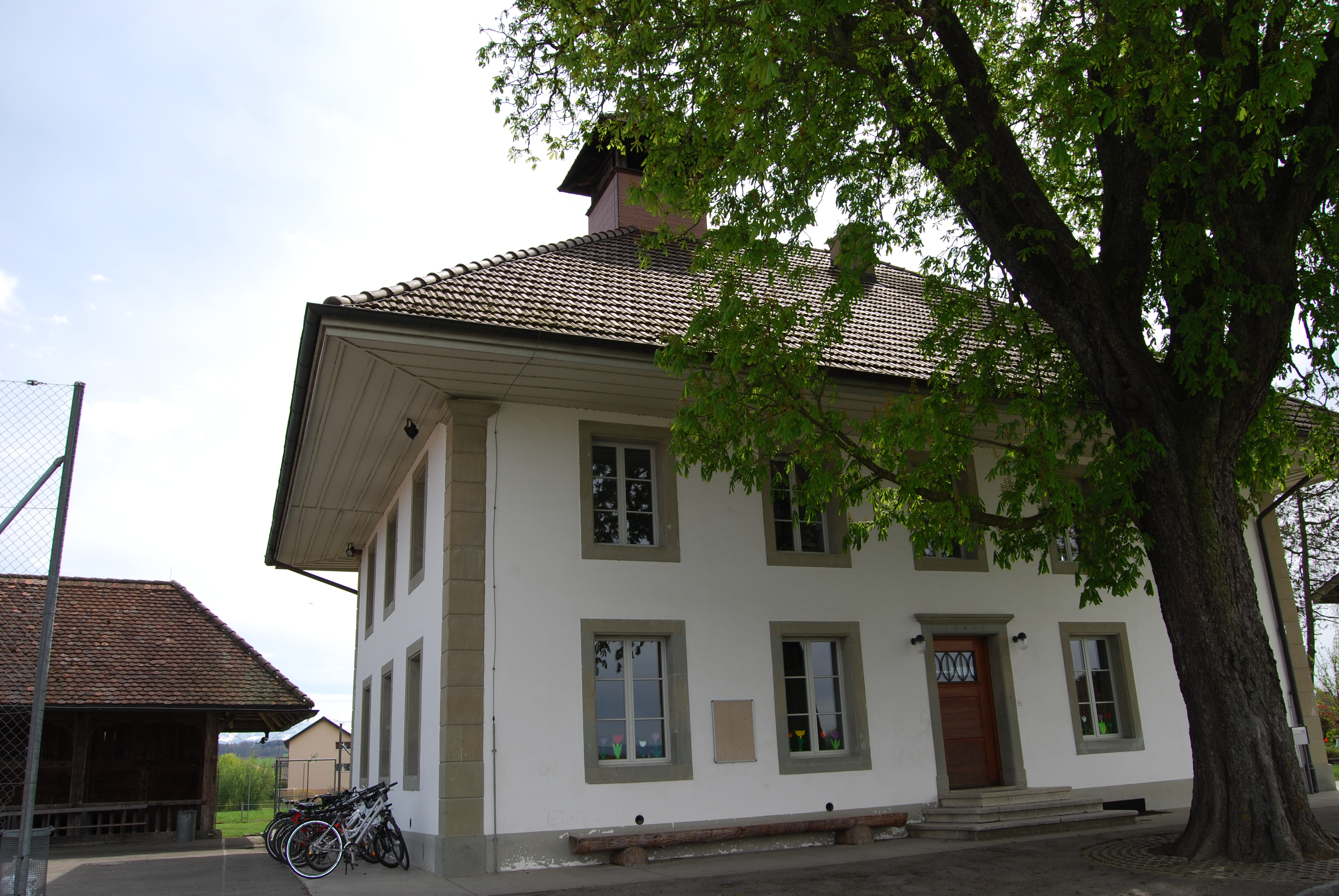
Kriechenwil schoolhouse, built 1839

In Kriechenwil about 59.8% of the population have completed non-mandatory upper secondary education, and 14.5% have completed additional higher education (either university or a Fachhochschule). Of the 37 who had completed some form of tertiary schooling listed in the census, 64.9% were Swiss men, 24.3% were Swiss women.

The Canton of Bern school system provides one year of non-obligatory Kindergarten, followed by six years of Primary school. This is followed by three years of obligatory lower Secondary school where the students are separated according to ability and aptitude. Following the lower Secondary students may attend additional schooling or they may enter an apprenticeship.

During the 2011-12 school year, there were a total of 14 students attending classes in Kriechenwil. There were no kindergarten classes in the municipality. The municipality had one primary class and 14 students.

As of 2000, there were a total of 31 students attending any school in the municipality. Of those, 29 both lived and attended school in the municipality, while 2 students came from another municipality. During the same year, 27 residents attended schools outside the municipality.
