= Bösingen, Fribourg =

Bösingen
- Municipality
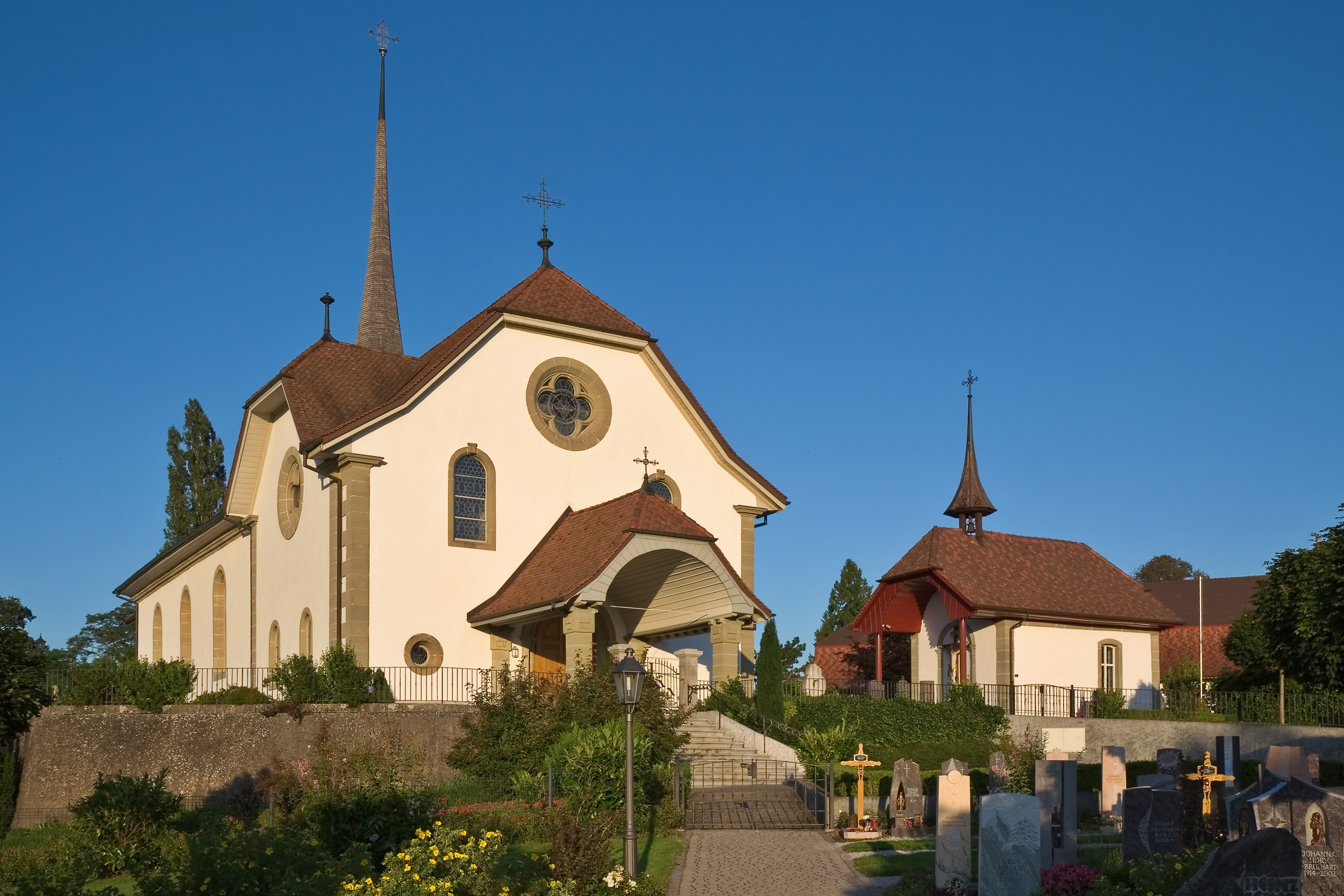
- St. Jakob church, Bösingen

- Flag Coat of arms
- Location of Bösingen
- Location within Switzerland Location within Canton of Fribourg
- Coordinates: 46°54′N 7°14′E
- Country: Switzerland
- Canton: Fribourg
- District: Sense

Government
  - Mayor: Gemeindeammann

Area
  - Total: 14.32 km^{2} (5.53 sq mi)
- Elevation: 550 m (1,800 ft)

Population (December 2020)
  - Total: 3,421
  - Density: 238.9/km^{2} (618.7/sq mi)
- Time zone: UTC+01:00 (CET)
  - Summer (DST): UTC+02:00 (CEST)
- Postal code: 3178
- SFOS number: 2295
- ISO 3166 code: CH-FR
- Surrounded by: Düdingen, Kleinbösingen, Kriechenwil (BE), Laupen (BE), Neuenegg (BE), Schmitten, Wünnewil-Flamatt
- Website: www.boesingen.ch

Bösingen (German: [ˈbøːzɪŋən]; French: Basens, formerly Bésingue; Arpitan: Besing [beˈzɛ̃]) is a municipality in the district of Sense in the canton of Fribourg in Switzerland. It is one of the municipalities with a large majority of German speakers in the mostly French speaking Canton of Fribourg.

== History ==
Bösingen is first mentioned in 1228 as Basens. The municipality was formerly known by its French name Bésingue, however, that name is no longer used. Between 1953–62 it was known as Grossbösingen.

== Geography ==
Bösingen has an area of 14.33 km^{2} (5.53 sq mi). Of this area, 10.77 km^{2} (4.16 mi^{2}) or 75.1% is used for agricultural purposes, while 2.11 km^{2} (0.81 mi^{2}) or 14.7% is forested. Of the rest of the land, 1.33 km^{2} (0.51 mi^{2}) or 9.3% is settled (buildings or roads), 0.11 km^{2} (27 acres) or 0.8% is either rivers or lakes.

Of the built up area, industrial buildings made up 1.4% of the total area while housing and buildings made up 5.0% and transportation infrastructure made up 2.4%. Out of the forested land, 13.5% of the total land area is heavily forested and 1.3% is covered with orchards or small clusters of trees. Of the agricultural land, 53.7% is used for growing crops and 20.2% is pastures, while 1.2% is used for orchards or vine crops. All the water in the municipality is flowing water.

The municipality is located in the Sense district. It consists of the haufendorf village (an irregular, unplanned and quite closely packed village, built around a central square) of Bösingen and the widely scattered hamlets of Fendringen, Friseneit, Grenchen, Litzistorf, Niederbösingen, Noflen, Lischera, Richterwil, Riederberg, Uttewil and Vogelshus.

== Coat of arms ==
The blazon of the municipal coat of arms is Per fess Or a Horse Head Sable issuant langued Gules and Gules between two Escallops a Harrow all Or.

== Demographics ==
Bösingen has a population (as of December 2020) of 3,421. As of 2008, 7.4% of the population are resident foreign nationals. Over the last 10 years (2000–2010) the population has changed at a rate of 6.2%. Migration accounted for 3.8%, while births and deaths accounted for 2.7%.

Most of the population (as of 2000) speaks German (2,887 or 92.6%) as their first language, Italian is the second most common (54 or 1.7%) and French is the third (44 or 1.4%). There are 2 people who speak Romansh.

As of 2008, the population was 50.4% male and 49.6% female. The population was made up of 1,495 Swiss men (45.7% of the population) and 156 (4.8%) non-Swiss men. There were 1,520 Swiss women (46.4%) and 103 (3.1%) non-Swiss women. Of the population in the municipality, 1,097 or about 35.2% were born in Bösingen and lived there in 2000. There were 514 or 16.5% who were born in the same canton, while 1,165 or 37.4% were born somewhere else in Switzerland, and 272 or 8.7% were born outside of Switzerland.

As of 2000, children and teenagers (0–19 years old) make up 29.4% of the population, while adults (20–64 years old) make up 62.2% and seniors (over 64 years old) make up 8.4%.

As of 2000, there were 1,351 people who were single and never married in the municipality. There were 1,566 married individuals, 121 widows or widowers and 79 individuals who are divorced.

As of 2000, there were 1,128 private households in the municipality, and an average of 2.7 persons per household. There were 220 households that consist of only one person and 108 households with five or more people. In 2000, a total of 1,101 apartments (93.3% of the total) were permanently occupied, while 48 apartments (4.1%) were seasonally occupied and 31 apartments (2.6%) were empty. As of 2009, the construction rate of new housing units was 5.2 new units per 1000 residents. The vacancy rate for the municipality, in 2010, was 0.83%.

The historical population is given in the following chart:

== Heritage sites of national significance ==
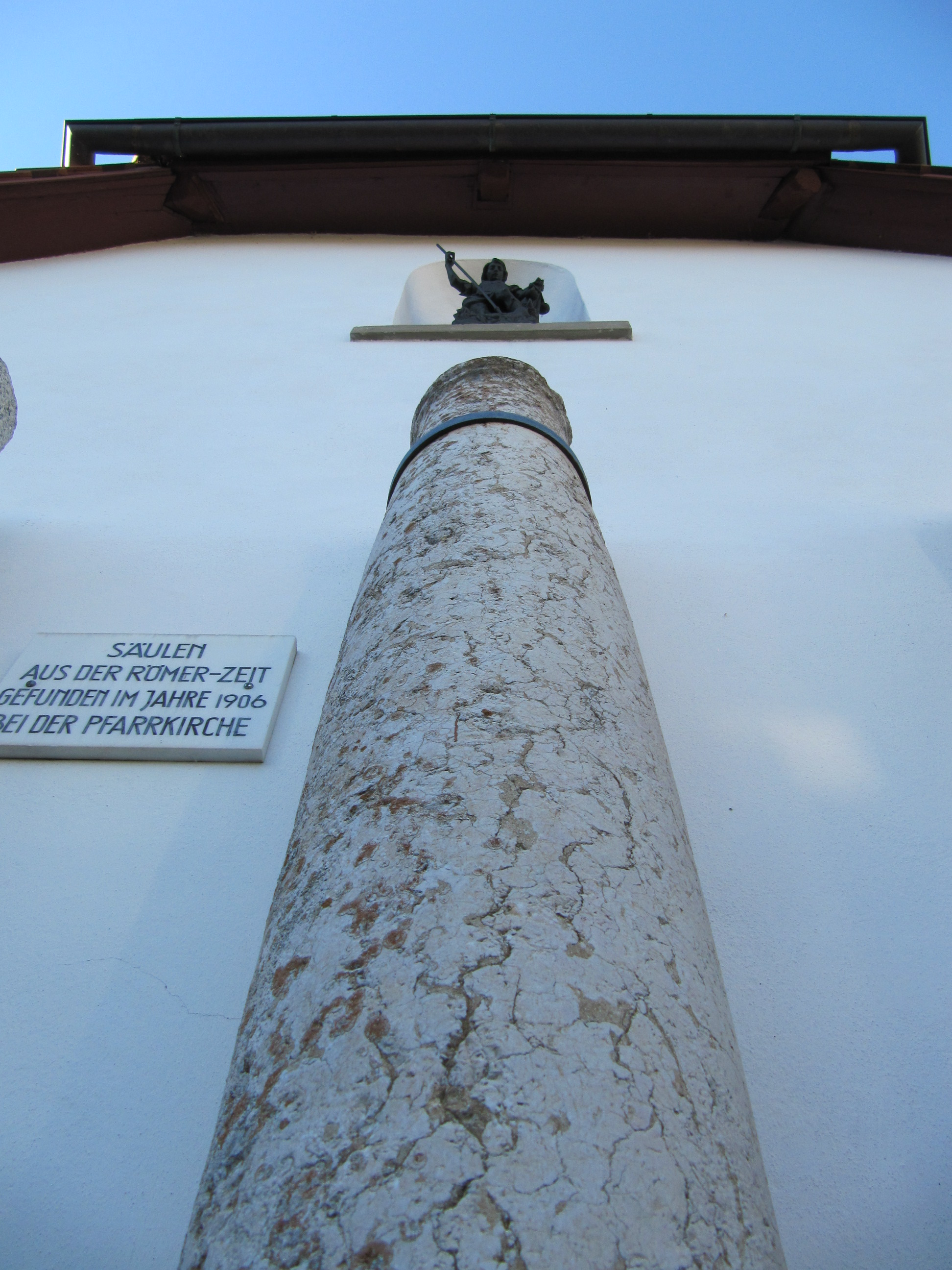
Gallo-Roman pillar in Bösingen

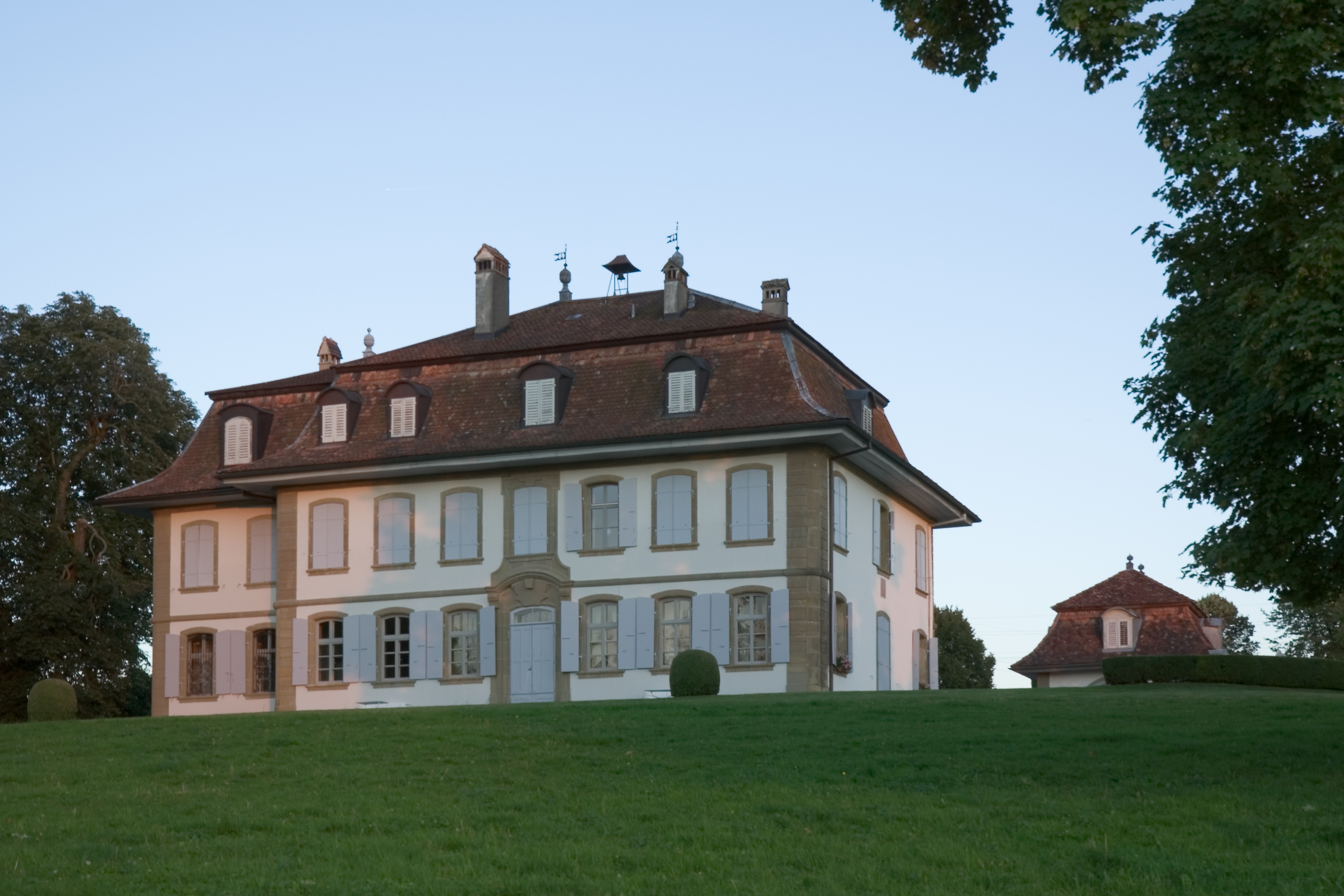
Vogelshus country estate

The Gallo-Roman complex, and the Vogelshus country estate are listed as Swiss heritage site of national significance. The entire village of Bösingen and the hamlet of Richterwil are both part of the Inventory of Swiss Heritage Sites.

== Politics ==
In the 2011 federal election the most popular party was the SVP which received 21.6% of the vote. The next three most popular parties were the SPS (20.9%), the CVP (19.8%) and the FDP (8.5%).

The SVP improved their position in Bösingen rising to first, from second in 2007 (with 22.3%) The SPS moved from third in 2007 (with 16.6%) to second in 2011, the CVP moved from first in 2007 (with 25.4%) to third and the FDP moved from below fourth place in 2007 to fourth. A total of 1,247 votes were cast in this election, of which 12 or 1.0% were invalid.

== Economy ==
As of 2010, Bösingen had an unemployment rate of 1.6%. As of 2008, there were 140 people employed in the primary economic sector and about 44 businesses involved in this sector. 376 people were employed in the secondary sector and there were 44 businesses in this sector. 407 people were employed in the tertiary sector, with 81 businesses in this sector. There were 1,670 residents of the municipality who were employed in some capacity, of which females made up 39.7% of the workforce.

In 2008 the total number of full-time equivalent jobs was 788. The number of jobs in the primary sector was 93, all of which were in agriculture. The number of jobs in the secondary sector was 356 of which 215 or (60.4%) were in manufacturing and 141 (39.6%) were in construction. The number of jobs in the tertiary sector was 339. In the tertiary sector; 143 or 42.2% were in wholesale or retail sales or the repair of motor vehicles, 11 or 3.2% were in the movement and storage of goods, 19 or 5.6% were in a hotel or restaurant, 37 or 10.9% were in the information industry, 15 or 4.4% were the insurance or financial industry, 48 or 14.2% were technical professionals or scientists, 21 or 6.2% were in education and 11 or 3.2% were in health care.

In 2000, there were 505 workers who commuted into the municipality and 1,240 workers who commuted away. The municipality is a net exporter of workers, with about 2.5 workers leaving the municipality for every one entering. Of the working population, 18% used public transportation to get to work, and 59.3% used a private car.

== Religion ==
From the 2000 census, 1,650 or 52.9% were Roman Catholic, while 1,039 or 33.3% belonged to the Swiss Reformed Church. Of the rest of the population, there were 17 members of an Orthodox church (or about 0.55% of the population), there were 2 individuals (or about 0.06% of the population) who belonged to the Christian Catholic Church, and there were 172 individuals (or about 5.52% of the population) who belonged to another Christian church. There were 32 (or about 1.03% of the population) who were Islamic. There were 6 individuals who were Buddhist, 9 individuals who were Hindu and 4 individuals who belonged to another church. 216 (or about 6.93% of the population) belonged to no church, are agnostic or atheist, and 54 individuals (or about 1.73% of the population) did not answer the question.

== Education ==
In Bösingen about 1,252 or (40.2%) of the population have completed non-mandatory upper secondary education, and 346 or (11.1%) have completed additional higher education (either university or a Fachhochschule). Of the 346 who completed tertiary schooling, 75.4% were Swiss men, 17.3% were Swiss women, 5.2% were non-Swiss men and 2.0% were non-Swiss women.

The Canton of Fribourg school system provides one year of non-obligatory Kindergarten, followed by six years of Primary school. This is followed by three years of obligatory lower Secondary school where the students are separated according to ability and aptitude. Following the lower Secondary students may attend a three or four year optional upper Secondary school. The upper Secondary school is divided into gymnasium (university preparatory) and vocational programs. After they finish the upper Secondary program, students may choose to attend a Tertiary school or continue their apprenticeship.

During the 2010-11 school year, there were a total of 243 students attending 13 classes in Bösingen. A total of 480 students from the municipality attended any school, either in the municipality or outside of it. There were 3 kindergarten classes with a total of 53 students in the municipality. The municipality had 10 primary classes and 190 students. During the same year, there were no lower secondary classes in the municipality, but 133 students attended lower secondary school in a neighboring municipality. There were no upper Secondary classes or vocational classes, but there were 52 upper Secondary students and 43 upper Secondary vocational students who attended classes in another municipality. The municipality had no non-university Tertiary classes, but there were 3 non-university Tertiary students and 7 specialized Tertiary students who attended classes in another municipality.

As of 2000, there were 8 students in Bösingen who came from another municipality, while 241 residents attended schools outside the municipality.

== Notable people ==
- Heinrich Schnyder (1897–1974), agronomist and politician
- Oliver Schaller (*1994), badminton player
- Yannik Zechner (*2005), songwriter
