= Cordast =

Former municipality, canton of Fribourg

- Former municipality
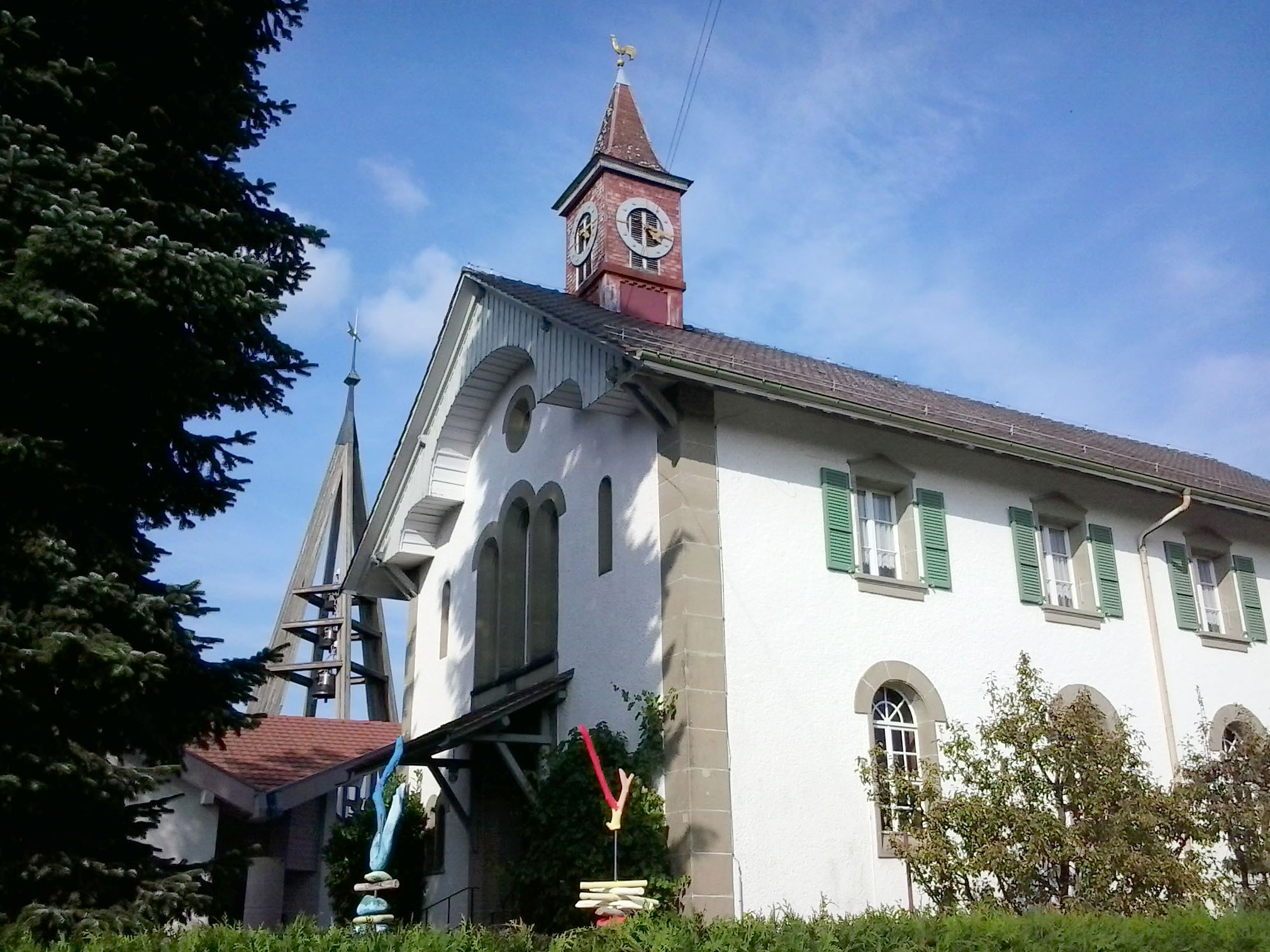
- Reformed church
- Location of Cordast
- Location within Switzerland Location within Canton of Fribourg
- Coordinates: 46.873892°N 7.151396°E
- Country: Switzerland
- Canton: Fribourg
- District: See
- Municipality: Gurmels

Population (2000)
  - Total: 752
- Time zone: UTC+01:00 (CET)
  - Summer (DST): UTC+02:00 (CEST)
- SFOS number: 2247
- ISO 3166 code: CH-FR
- Website

Cordast (French: La Corbaz) is a former municipality in the See district of the canton of Fribourg, Switzerland. Since 2005 it has been part of the municipality of Gurmels. It is a street village north of Fribourg.

== History ==
Cordast is first mentioned in 1294 in the French form Corbath, and in 1342 in the German form Curbdast. Hallstatt-period burial mounds point to early settlement. In the 14th century Cordast was among the possessions of the counts of Thierstein. In 1363 Peter de Pont appears as the owner of the tithes, which in the 15th century were further divided among Jakob von Englisberg, Jean Mossu and Jean Floret.

From 1442 to 1798 Cordast belonged to the Alte Landschaft (Old Territory) of the city of Fribourg, in the Hospital banner (Spitalpanner). It then belonged to the district of Murten (1798–1803), the district of Fribourg (1803–1830) and the German district (Deutscher Bezirk, 1830–1848), and since then to the See district.

From the Middle Ages the Catholics of Cordast belonged to the parish of Gurmels, and from 1614 they had their own chapel, dedicated to Saint Gerinus. Until they founded their own parish in 1874, the Reformed belonged to the church of Murten. With new building land opened up and brisk construction from the early 1990s, the number of residents commuting to work elsewhere rose in the village, which until then had been agricultural.

Cordast had 329 inhabitants in 1850, 378 in 1900, 374 in 1950, 342 in 1980, 497 in 1990 and 752 in 2000.

== Sources ==
- Service de la statistique du canton de Fribourg (2005). Annuaire statistique du canton de Fribourg 2004 / Statistisches Jahrbuch des Kantons Freiburg 2004 (PDF) (in French and German) (34th ed.).

This article incorporates text from a free content work. Licensed under CC-BY SA. Text taken from Cordast, Olivier Aebischer, Historical Dictionary of Switzerland.

== Bibliography ==
- O. Bürgy, Cordast, 1994
- H. Schöpfer, Der Seebezirk II (Die Kunstdenkmäler des Kantons Freiburg, 5), 2000, pp. 301–307
