= Kleingurmels =

Former municipality, canton of Fribourg

- Former municipality
- Location of Kleingurmels
- Location within Switzerland Location within Canton of Fribourg
- Coordinates: 46.883332°N 7.183344°E
- Country: Switzerland
- Canton: Fribourg
- District: See
- Municipality: Gurmels

Population (1990)
  - Total: 102
- Time zone: UTC+01:00 (CET)
  - Summer (DST): UTC+02:00 (CEST)
- ISO 3166 code: CH-FR
- Website

Kleingurmels (French: Cormondes-le-Petit) is a former municipality in the See district of the canton of Fribourg, Switzerland. Since 2000 it has been part of the municipality of Gurmels. The street village lies north of Fribourg at the end of the Schiffenen reservoir.

== History ==
Kleingurmels has always belonged to the parish of Gurmels. In 1442 it passed by purchase from the possessions of the counts of Thierstein to the city of Fribourg, and was assigned to its Hospital banner (Spitalpanner).

Kleingurmels became an independent municipality in the 19th century, but from 1880 it worked closely with the municipality of Gurmels (for example on the school and the fire brigade) and also shared an administration with it. In 1982 a vote brought complete separation from Gurmels, and from then on Kleingurmels was the smallest municipality in the canton. Around 2000 it offered about 50 to 60 jobs, most of them in the wood industry, and a new residential neighborhood was expected to bring a rise in population.

Kleingurmels had 119 inhabitants in 1850, 91 in 1900, 77 in 1941, 91 in 1950, 75 in 1970 and 102 in 1990.

== Bibliography ==
- J. Jungo, "Im Jahre 1982 trennte sich Kleingurmels von Gurmels", in Freiburger Nachrichten, 16 July 1993
- B. Bürgy, "Gurmels", in Freiburger Nachrichten, 20 August 1993
