= Ulmiz =

- Municipality
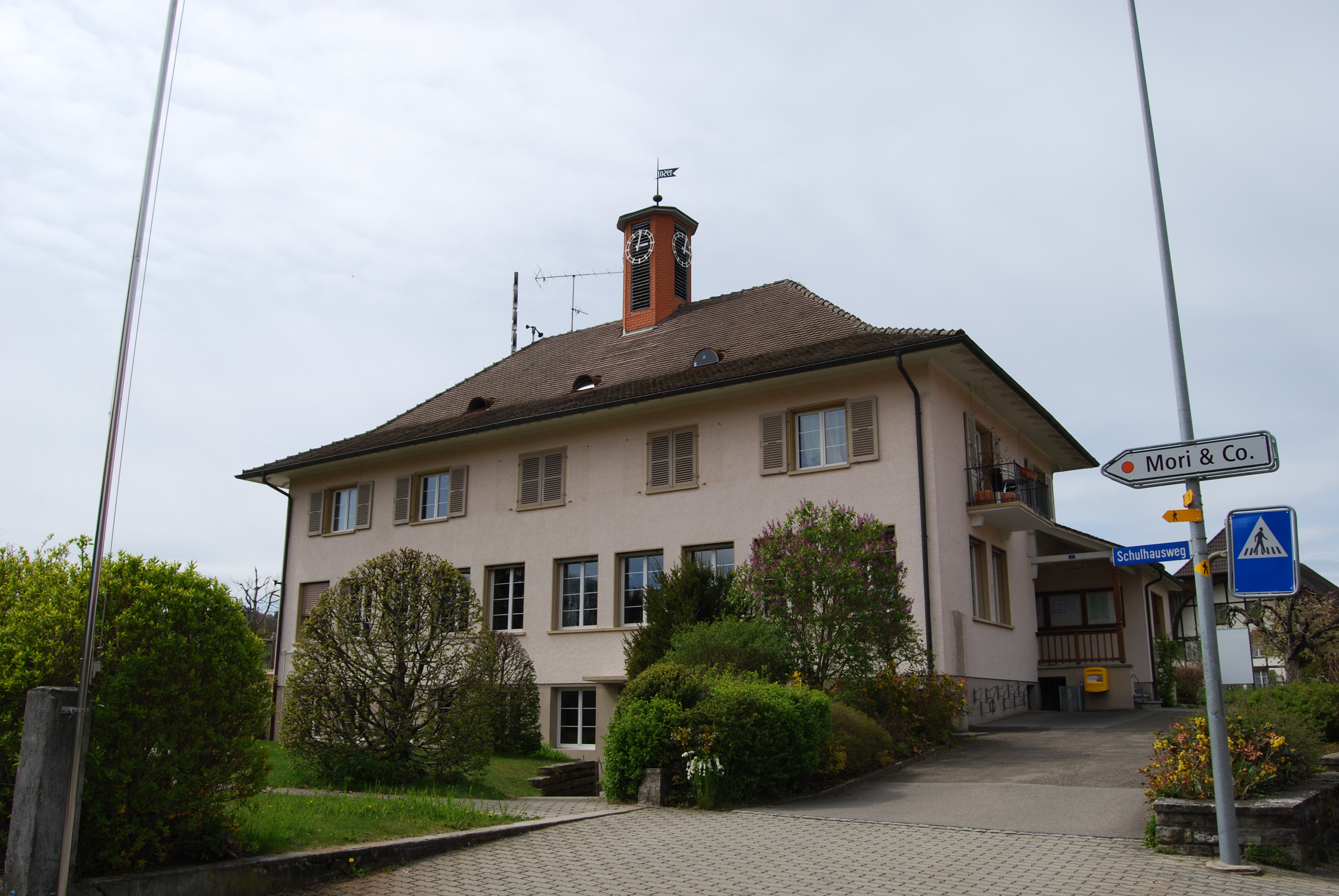

- Coat of arms
- Location of Ulmiz
- Location within Switzerland Location within Canton of Fribourg
- Coordinates: 46°56′N 7°12′E
- Country: Switzerland
- Canton: Fribourg
- District: See

Government
  - Executive: Gemeinderat with 5 members
  - Mayor: Ammann

Area
  - Total: 2.86 km^{2} (1.10 sq mi)
- Elevation: 494 m (1,621 ft)

Population (December 2020)
  - Total: 432
  - Density: 151/km^{2} (391/sq mi)
- Time zone: UTC+01:00 (CET)
  - Summer (DST): UTC+02:00 (CEST)
- Postal code: 3214
- SFOS number: 2278
- ISO 3166 code: CH-FR
- Surrounded by: Ferenbalm (BE), Staatswald Galm, Gempenach, Gurmels, Kriechenwil (BE), Lurtigen
- Website: www.ulmiz.ch

Ulmiz (French name: Ormey) is a former municipality in the district of See in the canton of Fribourg in Switzerland. It was one of the municipalities with a large majority of German speakers in the mostly French speaking Canton of Fribourg. On 1 January 2026 it was merged into the municipality of Gurmels.

== History ==
Ulmiz is first mentioned in 1200 as Hulmeis. In 1390 it was mentioned in French as Ormeis.

== Geography ==
Ulmiz has an area of 2.84 km^{2} (1.10 sq mi). Of this area, 1.93 km^{2} (0.75 mi^{2}) or 68.2% is used for agricultural purposes, while 0.74 km^{2} (0.29 mi^{2}) or 26.1% is forested. Of the rest of the land, 0.19 km^{2} (0.073 mi^{2}) or 6.7% is settled (buildings or roads).

Of the built up area, housing and buildings made up 4.2% and transportation infrastructure made up 1.8%. Out of the forested land, 24.4% of the total land area is heavily forested and 1.8% is covered with orchards or small clusters of trees. Of the agricultural land, 51.9% is used for growing crops and 15.2% is pastures, while 1.1% is used for orchards or vine crops.

The municipality is located in the See/Lac district, in a small depression in the Biber river valley.

== Coat of arms ==
The blazon of the municipal coat of arms is Azure, a Church Argent roofed Gules on a base Vert.

== Demographics ==
Ulmiz has a population (as of December 2020) of 432. As of 2008, 3.3% of the population are resident foreign nationals. Over the last 10 years (2000–2010) the population has changed at a rate of 24.8%. Migration accounted for 26.1%, while births and deaths accounted for 0.9%.

Most of the population (as of 2000) speaks German (347 or 96.7%) as their first language, French is the second most common (9 or 2.5%) and Albanian is the third (1 or 0.3%).

As of 2008, the population was 50.5% male and 49.5% female. The population was made up of 204 Swiss men (49.0% of the population) and 6 (1.4%) non-Swiss men. There were 200 Swiss women (48.1%) and 6 (1.4%) non-Swiss women. Of the population in the municipality, 137 or about 38.2% were born in Ulmiz and lived there in 2000. There were 37 or 10.3% who were born in the same canton, while 162 or 45.1% were born somewhere else in Switzerland, and 20 or 5.6% were born outside of Switzerland.

As of 2000, children and teenagers (0–19 years old) make up 23.7% of the population, while adults (20–64 years old) make up 53.8% and seniors (over 64 years old) make up 22.6%.

As of 2000, there were 143 people who were single and never married in the municipality. There were 171 married individuals, 36 widows or widowers and 9 individuals who are divorced.

As of 2000, there were 129 private households in the municipality, and an average of 2.6 persons per household. There were 25 households that consist of only one person and 11 households with five or more people. In 2000, a total of 128 apartments (93.4% of the total) were permanently occupied, while 6 apartments (4.4%) were seasonally occupied and 3 apartments (2.2%) were empty. As of 2009, the construction rate of new housing units was 14.7 new units per 1000 residents. The vacancy rate for the municipality, in 2010, was 1.6%.

The historical population is given in the following chart:

== Politics ==
In the 2011 federal election the most popular party was the SVP which received 40.2% of the vote. The next three most popular parties were the SPS (13.0%), the CVP (10.4%) and the FDP (10.1%).

The SVP received about the same percentage of the vote as they did in the 2007 Federal election (40.6% in 2007 vs 40.2% in 2011). The SPS moved from third in 2007 (with 16.8%) to second in 2011, the CVP moved from fourth in 2007 (with 8.1%) to third and the FDP moved from second in 2007 (with 17.8%) to fourth. A total of 153 votes were cast in this election, of which 4 or 2.6% were invalid.

== Economy ==
As of 2010, Ulmiz had an unemployment rate of 0.8%. As of 2008, there were 38 people employed in the primary economic sector and about 12 businesses involved in this sector. 1 person was employed in the secondary sector and there was 1 business in this sector. 97 people were employed in the tertiary sector, with 17 businesses in this sector. There were 181 residents of the municipality who were employed in some capacity, of which females made up 44.2% of the workforce.

In 2008 the total number of full-time equivalent jobs was 93. The number of jobs in the primary sector was 25, all of which were in agriculture. The number of jobs in the secondary sector was 1, all of which were in manufacturing. The number of jobs in the tertiary sector was 67. In the tertiary sector; 29 or 43.3% were in wholesale or retail sales or the repair of motor vehicles, 14 or 20.9% were in a hotel or restaurant, 1 was in the information industry, 1 was in education and 18 or 26.9% were in health care.

In 2000, there were 71 workers who commuted into the municipality and 101 workers who commuted away. The municipality is a net exporter of workers, with about 1.4 workers leaving the municipality for every one entering. Of the working population, 11.6% used public transportation to get to work, and 44.8% used a private car.

== Religion ==
From the 2000 census, 39 or 10.9% were Roman Catholic, while 275 or 76.6% belonged to the Swiss Reformed Church. Of the rest of the population, there were 2 members of an Orthodox church (or about 0.56% of the population), and there were 27 individuals (or about 7.52% of the population) who belonged to another Christian church. There were 4 (or about 1.11% of the population) who were Islamic. There was 1 person who was Buddhist. 21 (or about 5.85% of the population) belonged to no church, are agnostic or atheist, and 3 individuals (or about 0.84% of the population) did not answer the question.

== Education ==
In Ulmiz about 157 or (43.7%) of the population have completed non-mandatory upper secondary education, and 28 or (7.8%) have completed additional higher education (either university or a Fachhochschule). Of the 28 who completed tertiary schooling, 71.4% were Swiss men, 21.4% were Swiss women.

The Canton of Fribourg school system provides one year of non-obligatory Kindergarten, followed by six years of Primary school. This is followed by three years of obligatory lower Secondary school where the students are separated according to ability and aptitude. Following the lower Secondary students may attend a three or four year optional upper Secondary school. The upper Secondary school is divided into gymnasium (university preparatory) and vocational programs. After they finish the upper Secondary program, students may choose to attend a Tertiary school or continue their apprenticeship.

During the 2010-11 school year, there were a total of 45 students attending 2 classes in Ulmiz. A total of 68 students from the municipality attended any school, either in the municipality or outside of it. There were no kindergarten classes in the municipality, but 14 students attended kindergarten in a neighboring municipality. The municipality had 2 primary classes and 45 students. During the same year, there were no lower secondary classes in the municipality, but 19 students attended lower secondary school in a neighboring municipality. There were no upper Secondary classes or vocational classes, but there were 5 upper Secondary vocational students who attended classes in another municipality. The municipality had no non-university Tertiary classes, but there were 3 specialized Tertiary students who attended classes in another municipality.

As of 2000, there were 26 students in Ulmiz who came from another municipality, while 36 residents attended schools outside the municipality.
