= Gurmels =

- Municipality
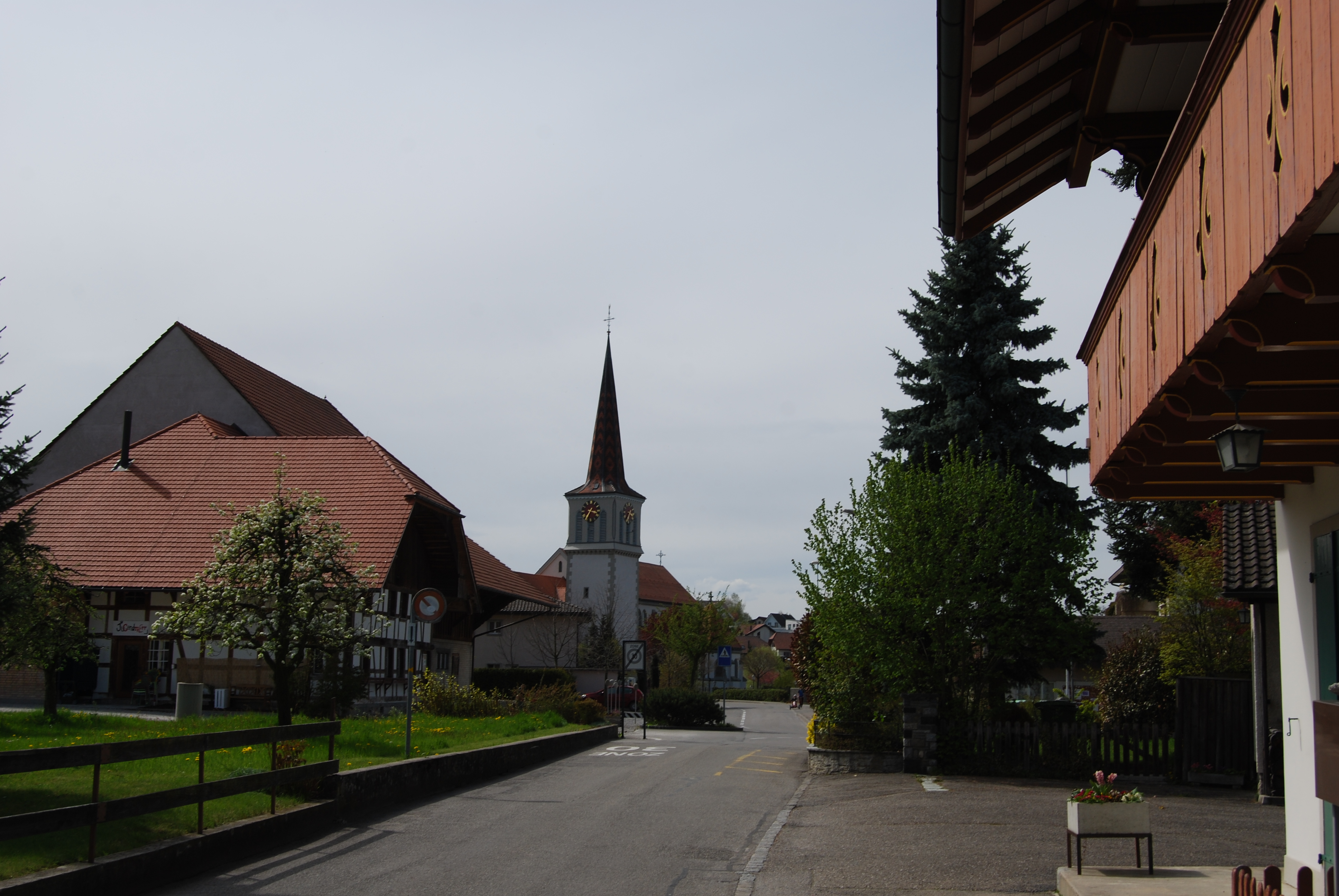
- Gurmels

- Coat of arms
- Location of Gurmels
- Location within Switzerland Location within Canton of Fribourg
- Coordinates: 46°54′N 7°10′E
- Country: Switzerland
- Canton: Fribourg
- District: See

Government
  - Executive: Gemeinderat with 7 members
  - Mayor: Gemeindepräsident

Area
  - Total: 17.21 km^{2} (6.64 sq mi)
- Elevation: 542 m (1,778 ft)

Population (December 2020)
  - Total: 4,487
  - Density: 260.7/km^{2} (675.3/sq mi)
- Time zone: UTC+01:00 (CET)
  - Summer (DST): UTC+02:00 (CEST)
- Postal code: 3212
- SFOS number: 2262
- ISO 3166 code: CH-FR
- Surrounded by: Barberêche, Courtepin, Cressier, Düdingen, Ferenbalm (BE), Staatswald Galm, Jeuss, Kleinbösingen, Kriechenwil (BE), Laupen (BE), Wallenried
- Website: www.gurmels.ch

Gurmels (German) or Cormondes (French: [kɔʁmɔ̃d], Franco-Provençal: [kɔʁˈmɔ̃dɛ]) is a municipality in the district of See in the canton of Fribourg in Switzerland.

Over the years, Gurmels has incorporated a number of smaller municipalities, most recently Ulmiz in January 2026.

== History ==
Gurmels is first mentioned in 1186 as Cormulnes. In 1228 it was mentioned as Cormunec and in 1242 as Cormugnes. Starting in the 15th century it was known as Cormondes. The German form of the name is first mentioned in 1240 as Gurmols.

In 1978, Monterschu and Grossgurmels merged to form Gurmels. The municipality of Kleingurmels merged into Gurmels in 2000 though the two municipalities had been jointly administered from 1880 until 1982. In 2003, the municipalities of Guschelmuth (Courchelmont), Liebistorf and Wallenbuch were all absorbed by Gurmels. Then, in 2005, the former municipality of Cordast joined. The most recent merger, with Ulmiz, took effect on 1 January 2026.

== Geography ==
Gurmels has an area, as of 2009, of 17.3 square kilometers (6.7 mi^{2}). Of this area, 11.86 km^{2} (4.58 mi^{2}) or 68.6% is used for agricultural purposes, while 3.45 km^{2} (1.33 mi^{2}) or 20.0% is forested. Of the rest of the land, 1.79 km^{2} (0.69 mi^{2}) or 10.4% is settled (buildings or roads), 0.11 km^{2} (27 acres) or 0.6% is either rivers or lakes.

Of the built up area, housing and buildings made up 6.1% and transportation infrastructure made up 3.1%. Out of the forested land, all of the forested land area is covered with heavy forests. Of the agricultural land, 55.4% is used for growing crops and 11.9% is pastures, while 1.3% is used for orchards or vine crops. Of the water in the municipality, 0.3% is in lakes and 0.3% is in rivers and streams.

The municipality is located in the See/Lac district, about 10 km (6.2 mi) north of Fribourg on the language border between German and French. It consists of the haufendorf village (an irregular, unplanned and quite closely packed village, built around a central square) of Gurmels along with a number of formerly independent municipalities.

== Coat of arms ==
The blazon of the municipal coat of arms is Per fess Argent a Semi Lion Gules rampant issuant and Azure a ploughshare Argent in bend.

== Demographics ==
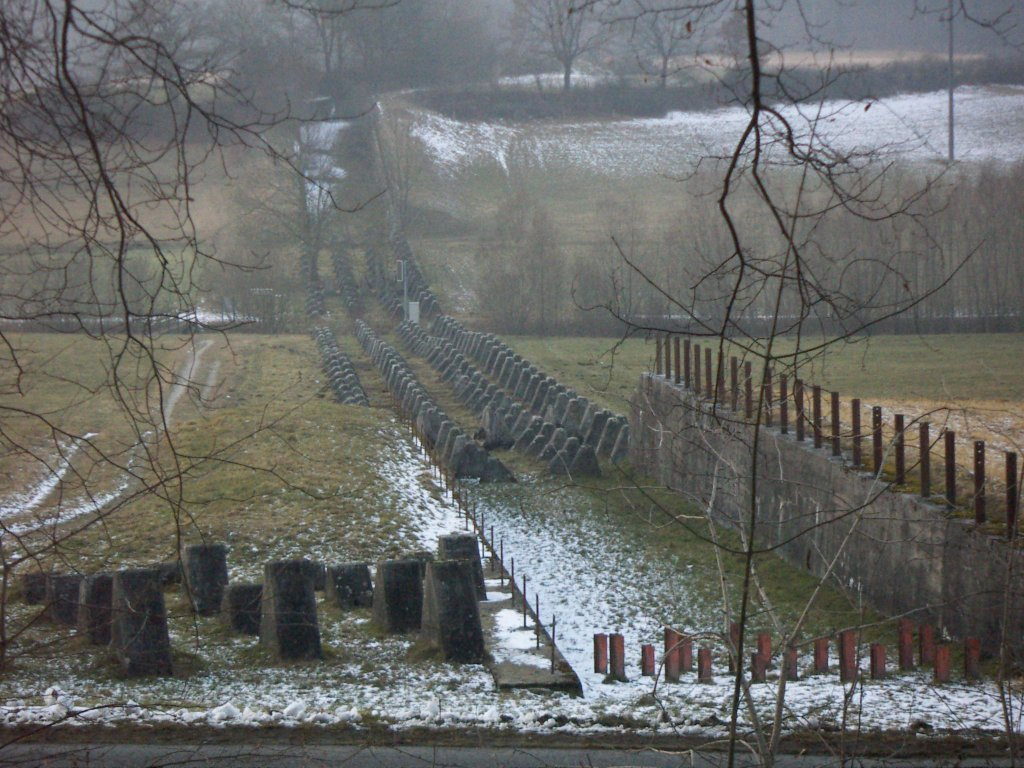
Old fortifications near Gurmels village

Gurmels has a population (as of December 2020) of 4,487. As of 2008, 6.2% of the population are resident foreign nationals. Over the last 10 years (2000–2010) the population has changed at a rate of 15.8%. Migration accounted for 14.3%, while births and deaths accounted for 4.6%.

It is a majority German speaking municipality in the mostly French speaking Canton of Fribourg. Most of the population (as of 2000) speaks German (1,420 or 93.4%) as their first language, French is the second most common (60 or 3.9%) and Italian is the third (13 or 0.9%). There is 1 person who speaks Romansh.

As of 2008, the population was 49.4% male and 50.6% female. The population was made up of 1,764 Swiss men (46.6% of the population) and 109 (2.9%) non-Swiss men. There were 1,795 Swiss women (47.4%) and 121 (3.2%) non-Swiss women. Of the population in the municipality, 556 or about 36.6% were born in Gurmels and lived there in 2000. There were 457 or 30.0% who were born in the same canton, while 341 or 22.4% were born somewhere else in Switzerland, and 100 or 6.6% were born outside of Switzerland.

As of 2000, children and teenagers (0–19 years old) make up 28.9% of the population, while adults (20–64 years old) make up 60.5% and seniors (over 64 years old) make up 10.6%.

As of 2000, there were 639 people who were single and never married in the municipality. There were 753 married individuals, 94 widows or widowers and 35 individuals who are divorced.

As of 2000, there were 1,192 private households in the municipality, and an average of 2.7 persons per household. There were 104 households that consist of only one person and 49 households with five or more people. In 2000, a total of 519 apartments (91.9% of the total) were permanently occupied, while 37 apartments (6.5%) were seasonally occupied and 9 apartments (1.6%) were empty. As of 2009, the construction rate of new housing units was 5.5 new units per 1000 residents. The vacancy rate for the municipality, in 2010, was 0.33%.

The historical population is given in the following chart:

== Politics ==
In the 2011 federal election the most popular party was the CVP which received 26.3% of the vote. The next three most popular parties were the SVP (24.1%), the SPS (15.7%) and the FDP (7.8%).

The CVP received about the same percentage of the vote as they did in the 2007 Federal election (29.1% in 2007 vs 26.3% in 2011). The SVP retained about the same popularity (26.9% in 2007), the SPS retained about the same popularity (12.4% in 2007) and the FDP retained about the same popularity (9.9% in 2007). A total of 1,281 votes were cast in this election, of which 13 or 1.0% were invalid.

== Economy ==
As of 2010, Gurmels had an unemployment rate of 1.8%. As of 2008, there were 166 people employed in the primary economic sector and about 56 businesses involved in this sector. 217 people were employed in the secondary sector and there were 39 businesses in this sector. 327 people were employed in the tertiary sector, with 76 businesses in this sector. There were 806 residents of the municipality who were employed in some capacity, of which females made up 42.6% of the workforce.

In 2008 the total number of full-time equivalent jobs was 545. The number of jobs in the primary sector was 111, of which 103 were in agriculture and 8 were in forestry or lumber production. The number of jobs in the secondary sector was 199 of which 70 or (35.2%) were in manufacturing and 128 (64.3%) were in construction. The number of jobs in the tertiary sector was 235. In the tertiary sector; 70 or 29.8% were in wholesale or retail sales or the repair of motor vehicles, 12 or 5.1% were in the movement and storage of goods, 21 or 8.9% were in a hotel or restaurant, 3 or 1.3% were in the information industry, 11 or 4.7% were the insurance or financial industry, 13 or 5.5% were technical professionals or scientists, 49 or 20.9% were in education and 34 or 14.5% were in health care.

In 2000, there were 161 workers who commuted into the municipality and 550 workers who commuted away. The municipality is a net exporter of workers, with about 3.4 workers leaving the municipality for every one entering. Of the working population, 7.9% used public transportation to get to work, and 69.7% used a private car.

== Religion ==
From the 2000 census, 983 or 64.6% were Roman Catholic, while 364 or 23.9% belonged to the Swiss Reformed Church. Of the rest of the population, there were 3 members of an Orthodox church (or about 0.20% of the population), there was 1 individual who belongs to the Christian Catholic Church, and there were 18 individuals (or about 1.18% of the population) who belonged to another Christian church. There were 30 (or about 1.97% of the population) who were Islamic. There were 7 individuals who were Buddhist. 67 (or about 4.40% of the population) belonged to no church, are agnostic or atheist, and 57 individuals (or about 3.75% of the population) did not answer the question.

== Education ==
In Gurmels about 594 or (39.1%) of the population have completed non-mandatory upper secondary education, and 143 or (9.4%) have completed additional higher education (either university or a Fachhochschule). Of the 143 who completed tertiary schooling, 77.6% were Swiss men, 17.5% were Swiss women, 4.2% were non-Swiss men.

The Canton of Fribourg school system provides one year of non-obligatory Kindergarten, followed by six years of Primary school. This is followed by three years of obligatory lower Secondary school where the students are separated according to ability and aptitude. Following the lower Secondary students may attend a three or four year optional upper Secondary school. The upper Secondary school is divided into gymnasium (university preparatory) and vocational programs. After they finish the upper Secondary program, students may choose to attend a Tertiary school or continue their apprenticeship.

During the 2010–11 school year, there were a total of 634 students attending 32 classes in Gurmels. A total of 715 students from the municipality attended any school, either in the municipality or outside of it. There were 5 kindergarten classes with a total of 108 students in the municipality. The municipality had 16 primary classes and 330 students. During the same year, there were 11 lower secondary classes with a total of 196 students. There were no upper Secondary classes or vocational classes, but there were 70 upper Secondary students and 71 upper Secondary vocational students who attended classes in another municipality. The municipality had no non-university Tertiary classes, but there was one non-university Tertiary student and 5 specialized Tertiary students who attended classes in another municipality.

As of 2000, there were 112 students in Gurmels who came from another municipality, while 32 residents attended schools outside the municipality.
