= Liebistorf =

Former municipality, canton of Fribourg

- Former municipality
- Chapel of Saint Urban
- Location of Liebistorf
- Location within Switzerland Location within Canton of Fribourg
- Coordinates: 46.90639°N 7.192777°E
- Country: Switzerland
- Canton: Fribourg
- District: See
- Municipality: Gurmels

Population (2000)
  - Total: 636
- Time zone: UTC+01:00 (CET)
  - Summer (DST): UTC+02:00 (CEST)
- ISO 3166 code: CH-FR
- Website

Liebistorf is a former municipality in the See district of the canton of Fribourg, Switzerland. It was dissolved on 1 January 2003 and merged with the municipality of Gurmels. The street village lies in the hills between Murten and Laupen, partly on an old southwest–northeast route and partly along the Biberen.

== History ==
Liebistorf is first mentioned in 1249 as Lubistorf. From the 15th century it formed a lordship, probably created by the Velga family, which passed to the von Erlach family in 1547 at the earliest and to the von Diesbach family in 1599. The Diesbachs called themselves Diesbach-Liebistorf.

Liebistorf has always belonged to the parish of Gurmels. The Catholic village chapel of Saint Urban, dating from the 17th century, was rebuilt in 1840. The first schoolhouse was built around 1820 and enlarged in 1902.

The mill that the knight Berthold von Schüpfen gave to the Knights Hospitaller in Fribourg in 1271 was probably the Lower Mill (Untere Mühle), which later belonged to the Velga family and was demolished in 1961. The Upper Mill (Obere Mühle), mentioned from 1496, still forms a hamlet with impressive 19th-century buildings. A sawmill operated in Liebistorf from 1828 to 1957. Since the 1970s the traditional settlement pattern has been breaking up as new neighborhoods of single-family houses have been laid out.

Liebistorf had 356 inhabitants in 1811, 310 in 1850, 374 in 1900, 400 in 1950, 384 in 1980 and 636 in 2000.

== Bibliography ==
- J.-P. Anderegg, Die Bauernhäuser des Kantons Freiburg, vol. 1, 1979
- Die Kunstdenkmäler des Kantons Freiburg, vol. 5, 2000, pp. 401–406
