= Ferenbalm =

- Municipality
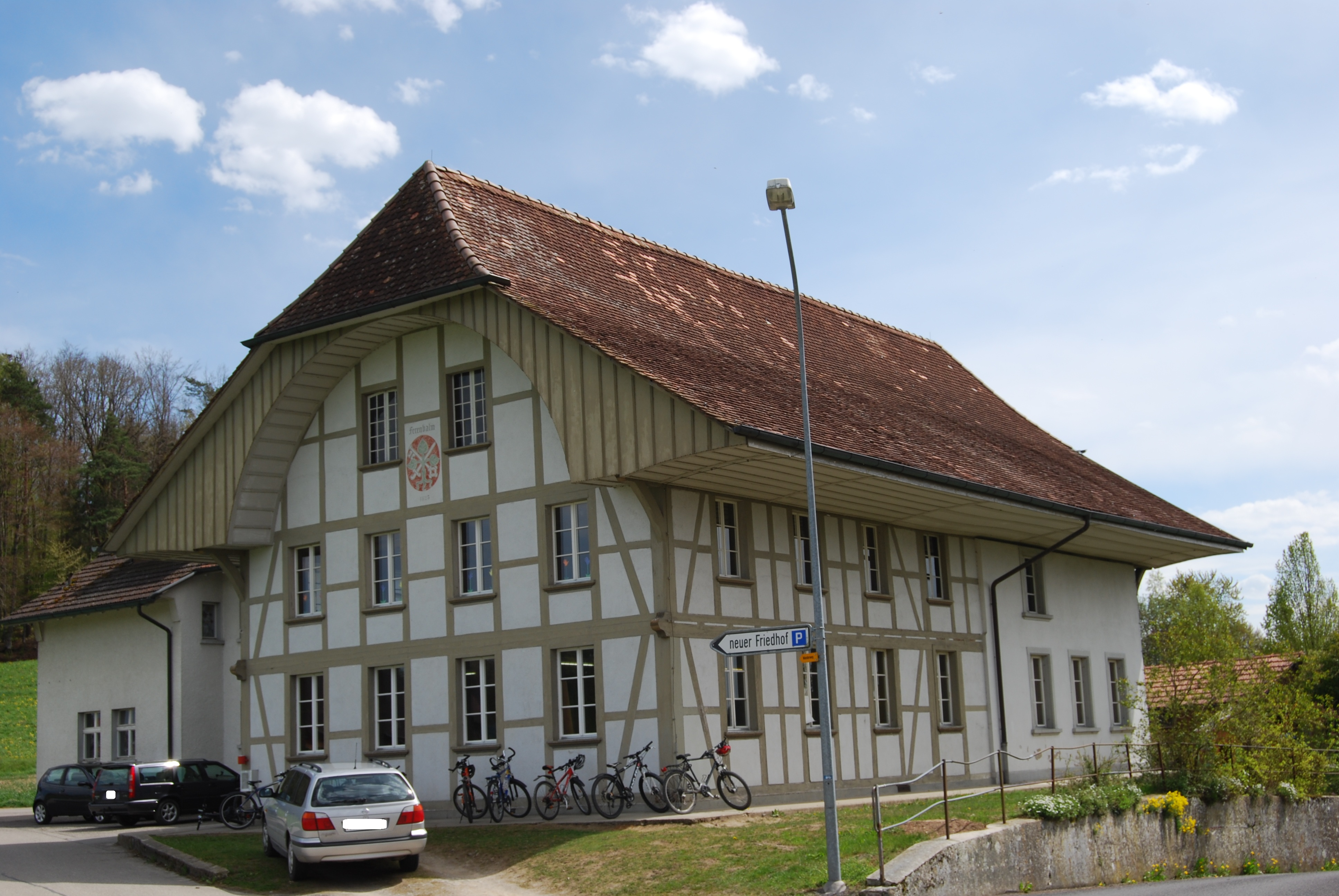

- Flag Coat of arms
- Location of Ferenbalm
- Location within Switzerland Location within Canton of Bern
- Coordinates: 46°56′N 7°12′E
- Country: Switzerland
- Canton: Bern
- District: Bern-Mittelland

Government
  - Executive: Gemeinderat with 7 members
  - Mayor: Gemeindepräsident; Karin Oppliger (as of 2026)

Area
  - Total: 9.18 km^{2} (3.54 sq mi)
- Elevation: 485 m (1,591 ft)

Population (December 2020)
  - Total: 1,214
  - Density: 132/km^{2} (343/sq mi)
- Time zone: UTC+01:00 (CET)
  - Summer (DST): UTC+02:00 (CEST)
- Postal code: 3206
- SFOS number: 662
- ISO 3166 code: CH-BE
- Surrounded by: Agriswil (FR), Gempenach (FR), Gurbrü, Gurmels (FR), Kriechenwil, Laupen, Mühleberg, Ulmiz (FR), Wileroltigen
- Website: www.ferenbalm.ch

Ferenbalm (French: Les Baumettes) is a municipality in the Bern-Mittelland administrative district in the canton of Bern in Switzerland.

== History ==
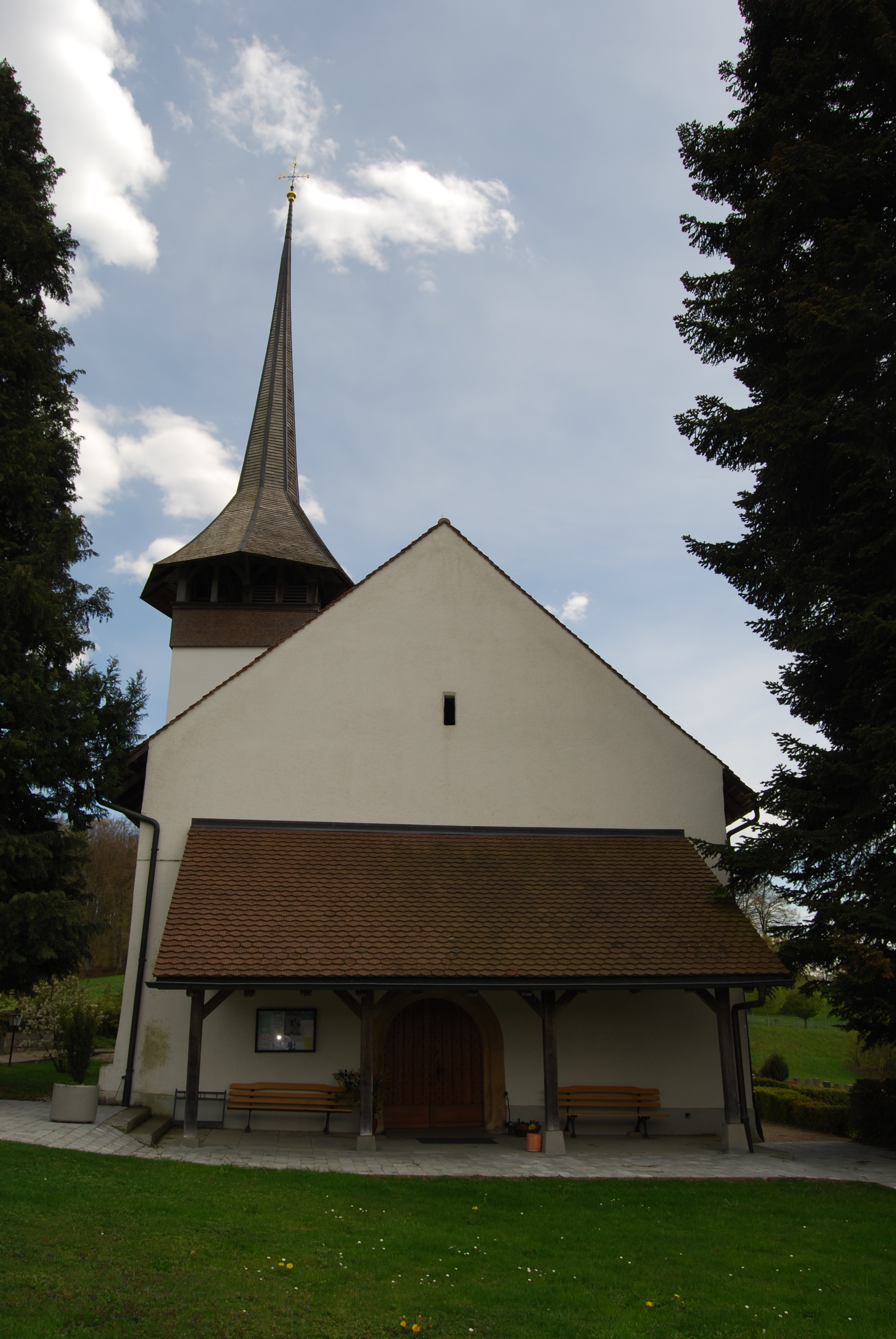
The village church of Ferenbalm, rebuilt after a fire in 1657.

Ferenbalm is first mentioned in 1123 as villa de Balmis. Since the 16th century it was called Feren-Balm to differenate it from Oberbalm.

The oldest trace of settlements in the area are scattered grave mounds which are probably from the Hallstatt era. In addition, a grave mound from the La Tene era has been discovered. There was a Roman settlement at Gümirain, of which only bricks and ceramics remain, and another at Biberen, from which bronze pipes have been found.

A document has been found which claims that the Kings of Burgundy gave this region to Payerne Priory in 961-62. However it is now believed to be a later forgery. However, by 1123, Ferenbalm was part of the estates of the Priory. During the 13th century the Counts of Kyburg acquired the village and made it part of the Herrschaft of Oltigen. In 1410, the Kyburg Counts were deep in debt and were forced to sell Oltigen and its Herrschaft to the city of Bern. Part of the modern municipality of Ferenbalm was placed in the district of Laupen in 1483. The villages of Biberen and Gammen were added later between 1502 and 1527.

The village church of St. Peter and Paul was first mentioned along with the village in 1123. In 1528 Bern adopted the new faith of the Protestant Reformation, which quickly spread throughout the entire canton. In Ferenbalm, the village church converted to the new faith and became a Reformed parish church. The parish included many of the surrounding German speaking communities, some of which were part of the French-speaking Canton of Fribourg. The Church of St. Peter and Paul was rebuilt following a fire in 1657.

The villages that make up Ferenbalm have always profited from their location at the fork of the road from Bern to Lausanne and Neuchâtel. When the railroad built a station in the municipality, it brought additional revenue and residents. Beginning in the 1960s many commuters moved to Ferenbalm and the housing developments of Kleingümmenen, Biberen and Rizenbach were built. Today about half of the working residents commute to jobs in nearby cities. Municipal schools were built in Ferenbalm, Vogelbuch and Gammen.

== Geography ==
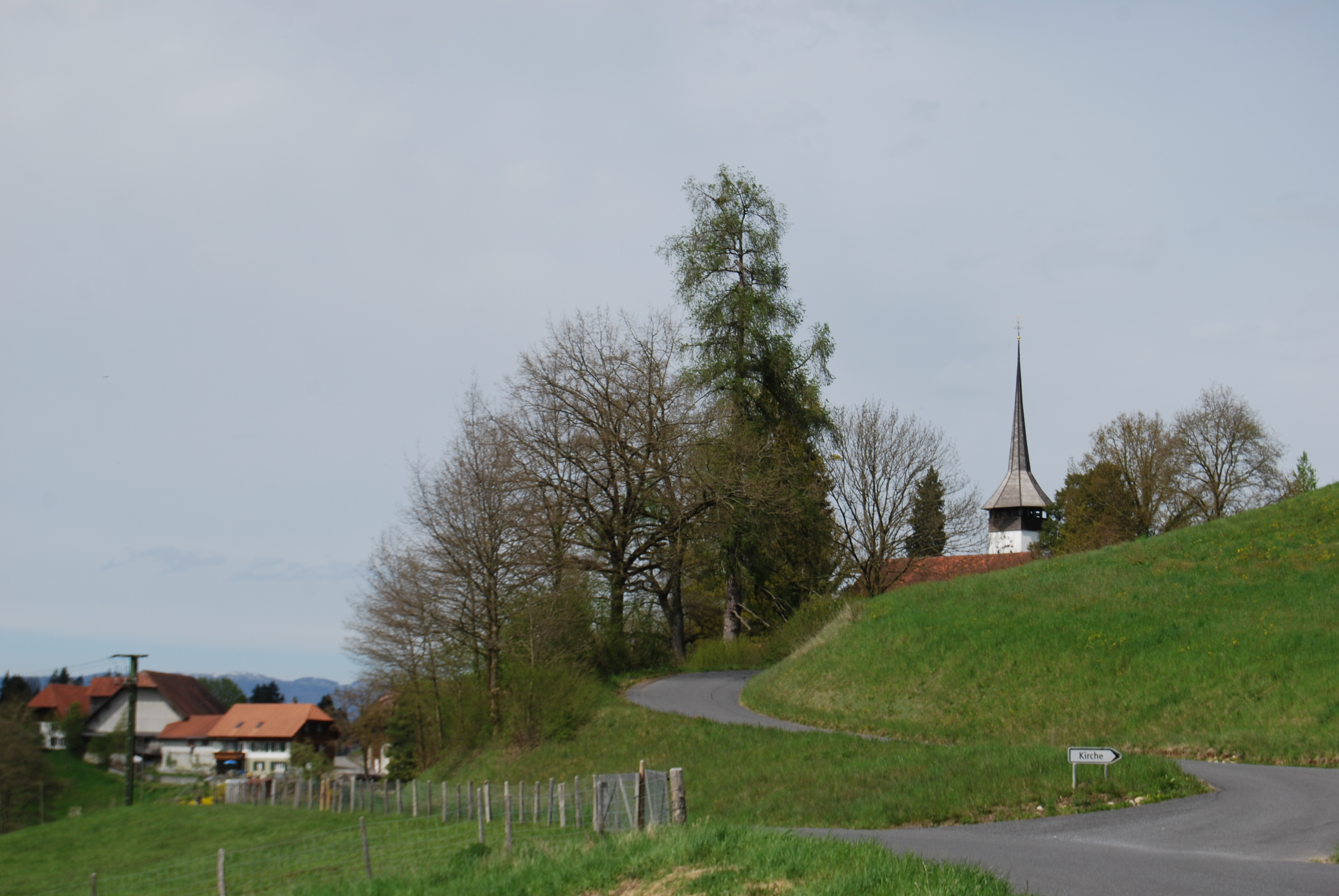
Ferenbalm village and church

Ferenbalm has an area of 9.17 km^{2} (3.54 sq mi). As of 2012, a total of 6.27 km^{2} (2.42 mi^{2}) or 68.3% is used for agricultural purposes, while 1.75 km^{2} (0.68 mi^{2}) or 19.1% is forested. Of the rest of the land, 1.05 km^{2} (0.41 mi^{2}) or 11.4% is settled (buildings or roads), 0.15 km^{2} (37 acres) or 1.6% is either rivers or lakes and 0.01 km^{2} (2.5 acres) or 0.1% is unproductive land.

During the same year, housing and buildings made up 5.2% and transportation infrastructure made up 5.7%. Out of the forested land, 17.8% of the total land area is heavily forested and 1.3% is covered with orchards or small clusters of trees. Of the agricultural land, 54.2% is used for growing crops and 12.3% is pastures, while 1.7% is used for orchards or vine crops. All the water in the municipality is flowing water.

Ferenbalm lies on the plateau between the Saane and Bibern rivers. The municipality does not have a central town; it is instead made up of the villages of Ferenbalm, Vogelbuch, Kleingümmenen, Rizenbach, Biberen, Jerisberg, Jerisberghof, Haselhof and the exclave Gammen. It is on the border with the Canton of Fribourg and surrounds an exclave of that Canton.

On 31 December 2009 Amtsbezirk Laupen, the municipality's former district, was dissolved. On the following day, 1 January 2010, it joined the newly created Verwaltungskreis Bern-Mittelland.

== Coat of arms ==
The blazon of the municipal coat of arms is Gules a Key and a Sword both Argent in saltire and a Linden Tree eradicated Vert.

== Demographics ==
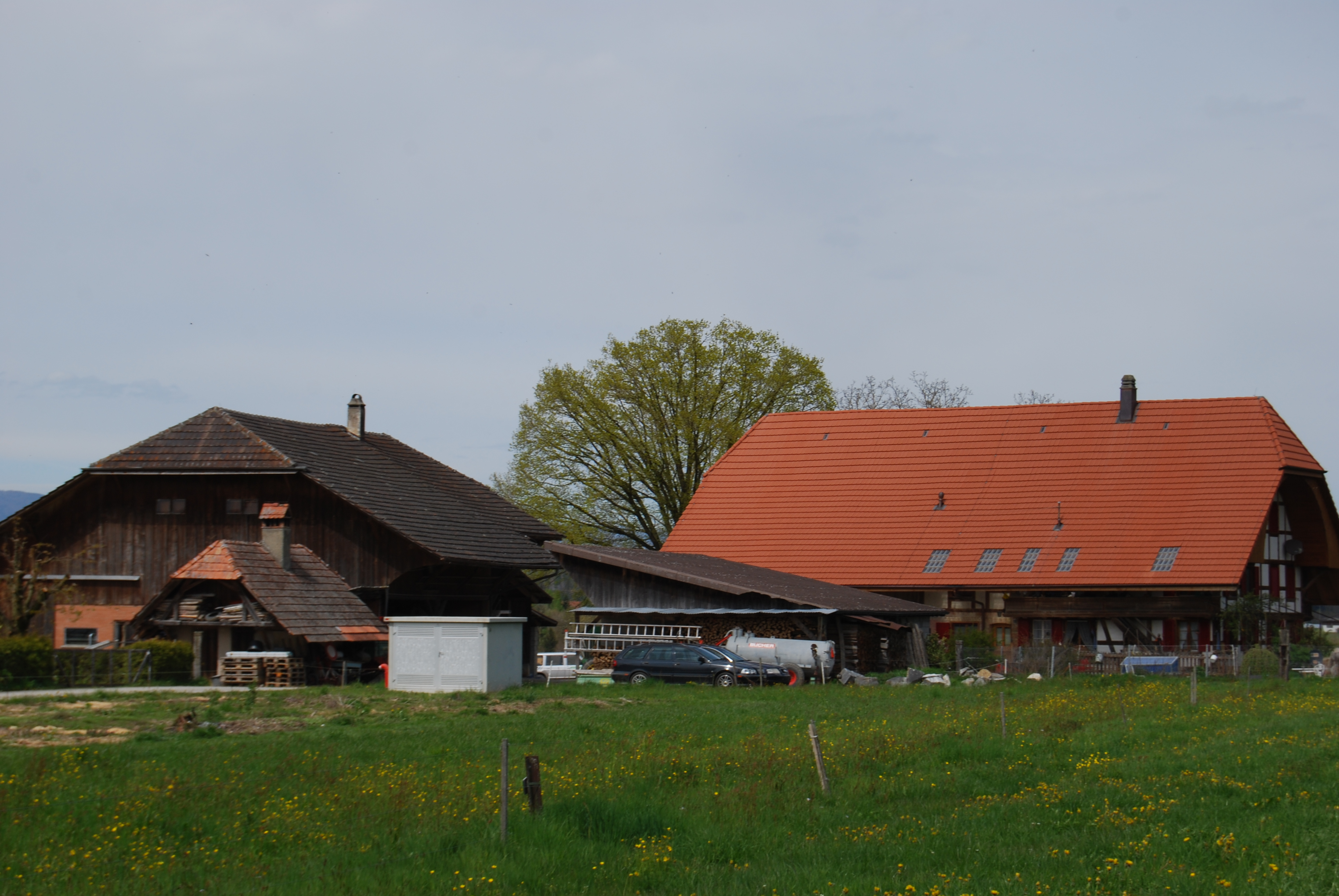
Farm house in Ferenbalm municipality

Ferenbalm has a population (as of December 2020) of 1,214. As of 2010, 7.2% of the population are resident foreign nationals. Over the last 10 years (2001–2011) the population has changed at a rate of -1.1%. Migration accounted for -1.1%, while births and deaths accounted for 0.2%.

Most of the population (as of 2000) speaks German (1,208 or 95.7%) as their first language, French is the second most common (13 or 1.0%) and Italian is the third (13 or 1.0%). There is 1 person who speaks Romansh.

As of 2008, the population was 47.9% male and 52.1% female. The population was made up of 556 Swiss men (43.9% of the population) and 50 (3.9%) non-Swiss men. There were 619 Swiss women (48.9%) and 41 (3.2%) non-Swiss women. Of the population in the municipality, 395 or about 31.3% were born in Ferenbalm and lived there in 2000. There were 520 or 41.2% who were born in the same canton, while 238 or 18.9% were born somewhere else in Switzerland, and 73 or 5.8% were born outside of Switzerland.

As of 2011, children and teenagers (0–19 years old) make up 17.6% of the population, while adults (20–64 years old) make up 64.6% and seniors (over 64 years old) make up 17.8%.

As of 2000, there were 530 people who were single and never married in the municipality. There were 625 married individuals, 66 widows or widowers and 41 individuals who are divorced.

As of 2010, there were 124 households that consist of only one person and 27 households with five or more people. In 2000, a total of 481 apartments (91.6% of the total) were permanently occupied, while 30 apartments (5.7%) were seasonally occupied and 14 apartments (2.7%) were empty. The vacancy rate for the municipality, in 2012, was 1.52%.

The historical population is given in the following chart:

== Heritage sites of national significance ==
The old house in Jerisberghof, the farm house at Statthalterhof, the railroad-viaduct over the Saane river and the Ofen house are listed as Swiss heritage site of national significance. The entire village of Gammen and the hamlet of Jerisberghof are both part of the Inventory of Swiss Heritage Sites.

The old house in Jerisberghof dates from 1703, and is now the site of a farm museum.

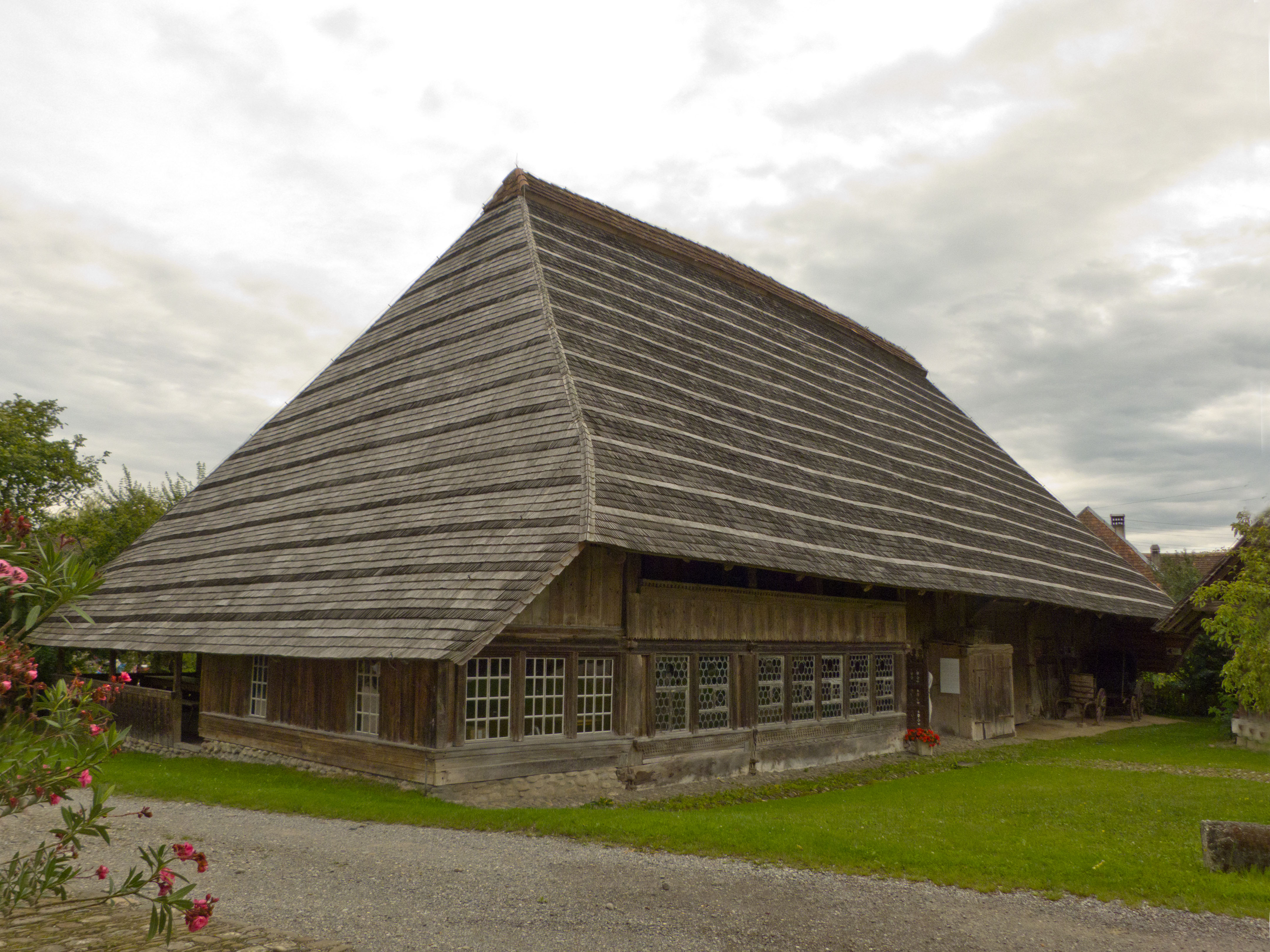
The old house at Jerisberghof

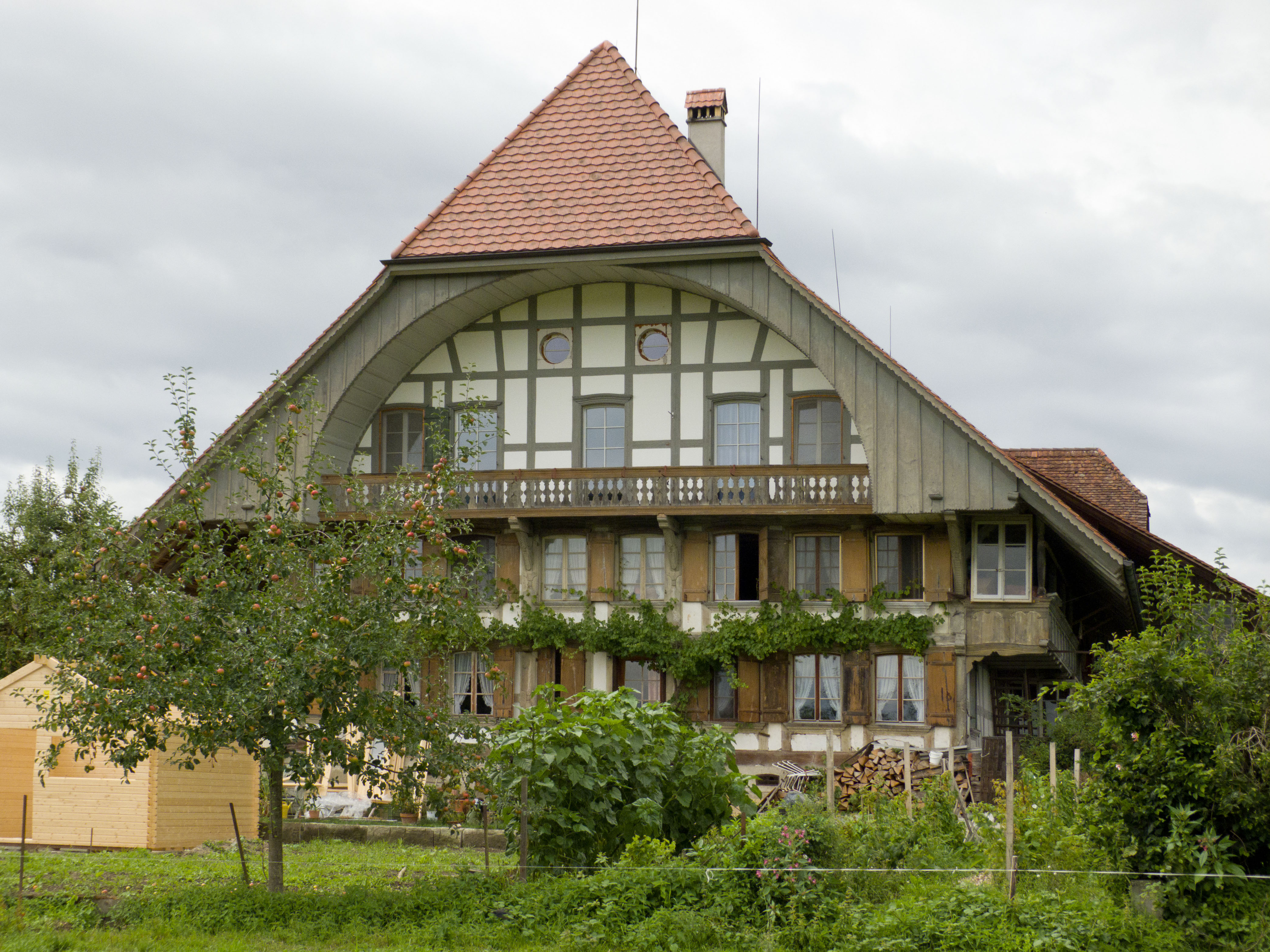
Farm House at Statthalterhof

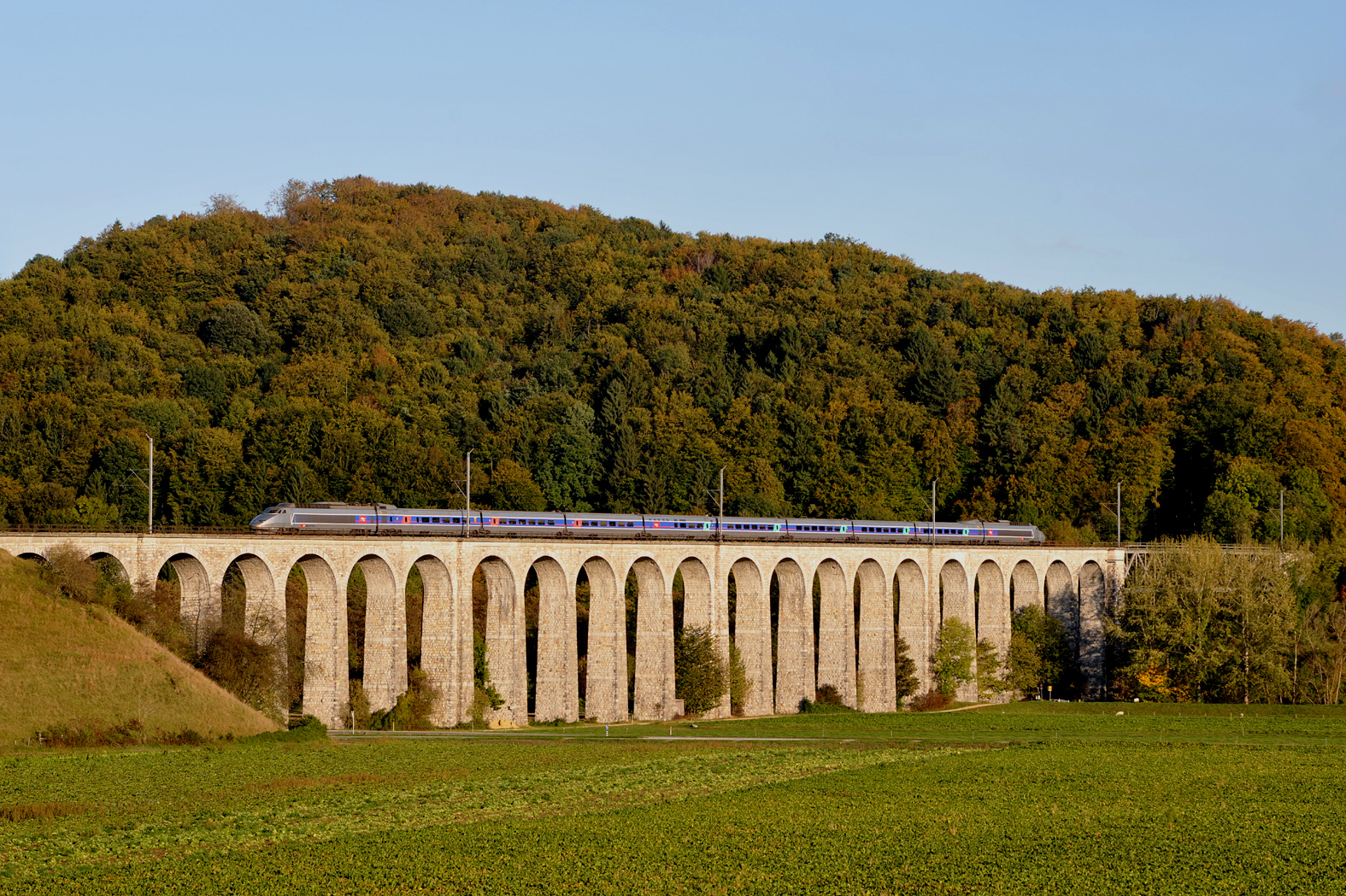
Railroad-Viaduct over the Saane river

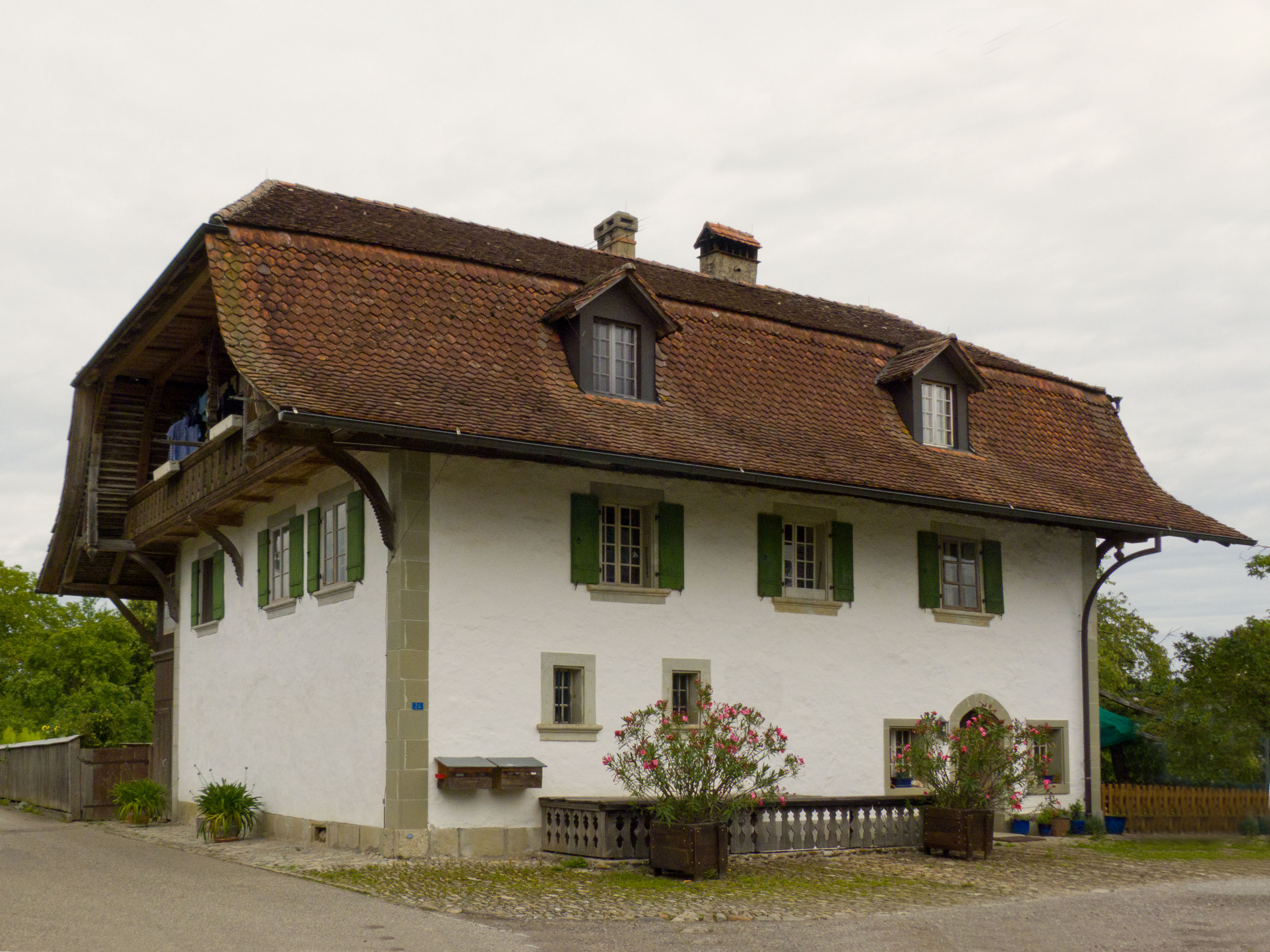
Ofen house

== Politics ==
In the 2011 federal election the most popular party was the Swiss People's Party (SVP) which received 41.9% of the vote. The next three most popular parties were the Conservative Democratic Party (BDP) (16.5%), the Social Democratic Party (SP) (12.5%) and the Green Party (7.9%). In the federal election, a total of 512 votes were cast, and the voter turnout was 51.7%.

== Economy ==
As of 2011, Ferenbalm had an unemployment rate of 0.98%. As of 2008, there were a total of 335 people employed in the municipality. Of these, there were 112 people employed in the primary economic sector and about 41 businesses involved in this sector. 113 people were employed in the secondary sector and there were 17 businesses in this sector. 110 people were employed in the tertiary sector, with 22 businesses in this sector. There were 716 residents of the municipality who were employed in some capacity, of which females made up 42.5% of the workforce.

In 2008 there were a total of 269 full-time equivalent jobs. The number of jobs in the primary sector was 76, all of which were in agriculture. The number of jobs in the secondary sector was 99 of which 69 or (69.7%) were in manufacturing and 31 (31.3%) were in construction. The number of jobs in the tertiary sector was 94. In the tertiary sector; 52 or 55.3% were in wholesale or retail sales or the repair of motor vehicles, 1 was in the movement and storage of goods, 13 or 13.8% were in a hotel or restaurant, 1 was in the information industry, 10 or 10.6% were technical professionals or scientists, 6 or 6.4% were in education.

In 2000, there were 122 workers who commuted into the municipality and 501 workers who commuted away. The municipality is a net exporter of workers, with about 4.1 workers leaving the municipality for every one entering. A total of 215 workers (63.8% of the 337 total workers in the municipality) both lived and worked in Ferenbalm.

Of the working population, 24.7% used public transportation to get to work, and 46.2% used a private car.

In 2011 the average local and cantonal tax rate on a married resident of Ferenbalm making 150,000 CHF was 12.5%, while an unmarried resident's rate was 18.3%. For comparison, the average rate for the entire canton in 2006 was 13.9% and the nationwide rate was 11.6%. In 2009 there were a total of 563 tax payers in the municipality. Of that total, 187 made over 75 thousand CHF per year. There was one person who made between 15 and 20 thousand per year. The average income of the over 75,000 CHF group in Ferenbalm was 109,905 CHF, while the average across all of Switzerland was 130,478 CHF.

== Religion ==
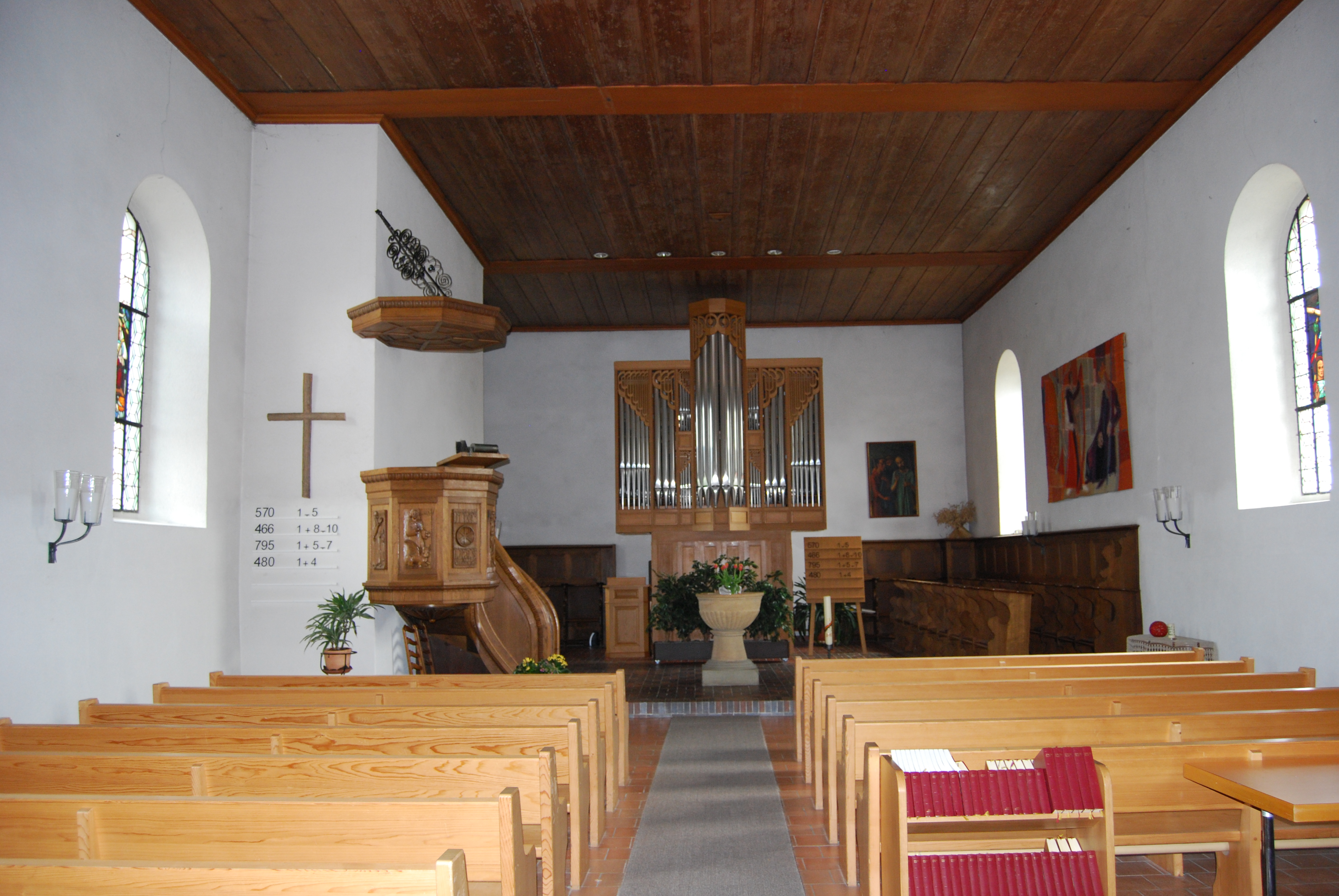
Interior of Ferenbalm's Protestant church

From the 2000 census, 930 or 73.7% belonged to the Swiss Reformed Church, while 146 or 11.6% were Roman Catholic. Of the rest of the population, there were 12 members of an Orthodox church (or about 0.95% of the population), and there were 93 individuals (or about 7.37% of the population) who belonged to another Christian church. There were 7 (or about 0.55% of the population) who were Islamic. 79 (or about 6.26% of the population) belonged to no church, are agnostic or atheist, and 41 individuals (or about 3.25% of the population) did not answer the question.

== Education ==
In Ferenbalm about 59.6% of the population have completed non-mandatory upper secondary education, and 19.5% have completed additional higher education (either university or a Fachhochschule). Of the 154 who had completed some form of tertiary schooling listed in the census, 71.4% were Swiss men, 20.8% were Swiss women and 5.2% were non-Swiss women.

The Canton of Bern school system provides one year of non-obligatory Kindergarten, followed by six years of Primary school. This is followed by three years of obligatory lower Secondary school where the students are separated according to ability and aptitude. Following the lower Secondary students may attend additional schooling or they may enter an apprenticeship.

During the 2011-12 school year, there were a total of 84 students attending classes in Ferenbalm. There was one kindergarten class with a total of 17 students in the municipality. Of the kindergarten students, 11.8% were permanent or temporary residents of Switzerland (not citizens) and 5.9% have a different mother language than the classroom language. The municipality had 3 primary classes and 67 students. Of the primary students, 3.0% were permanent or temporary residents of Switzerland (not citizens) and 3.0% have a different mother language than the classroom language.

As of 2000, there were a total of 98 students attending any school in the municipality. Of those, 94 both lived and attended school in the municipality, while 4 students came from another municipality. During the same year, 102 residents attended schools outside the municipality.

== Transportation ==
The municipality has a railway station, Gümmenen, on the Bern–Neuchâtel line.
