= Guschelmuth =

Former municipality, canton of Fribourg

- Former municipality
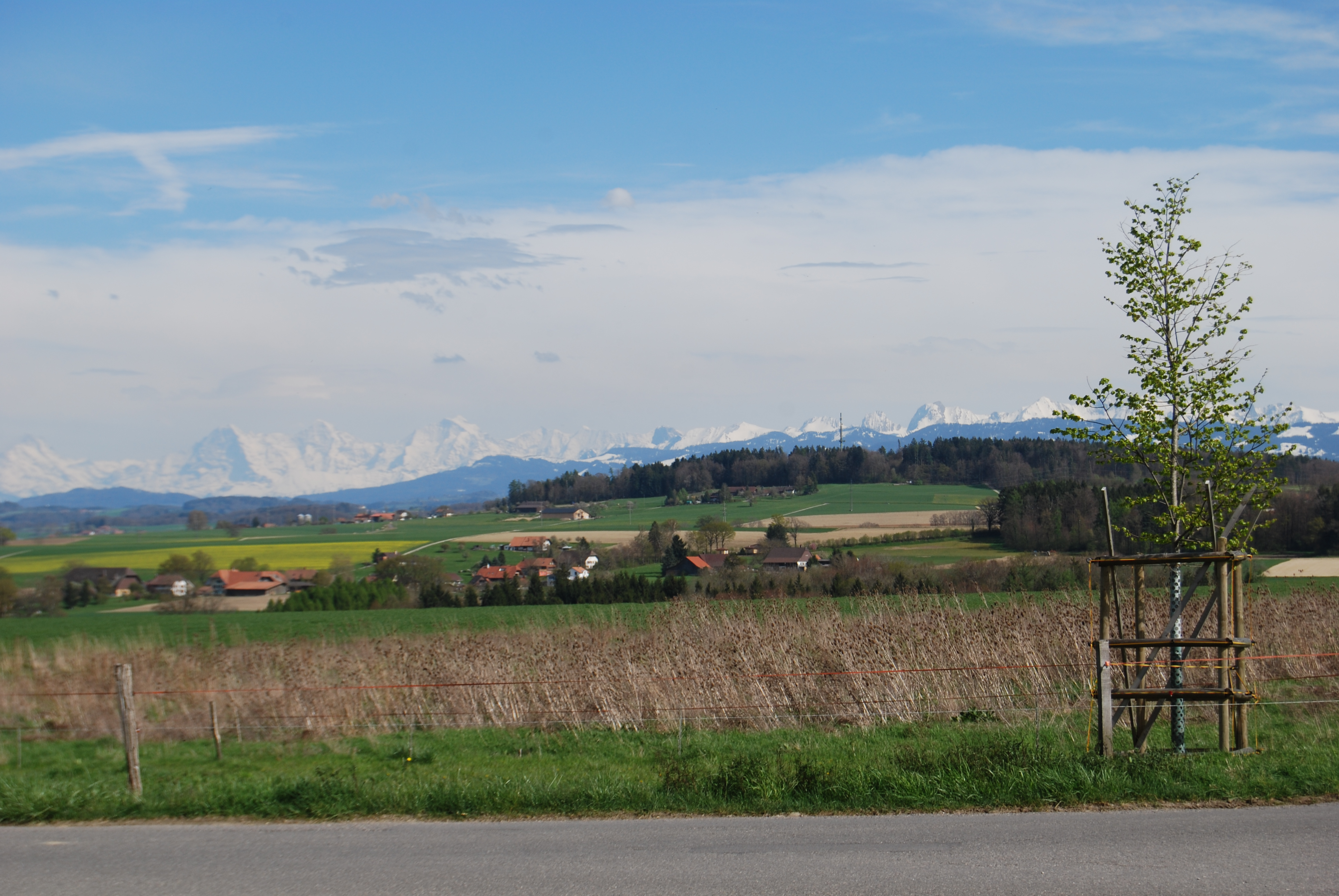
- Kleinguschelmuth seen from Cressier
- Location of Guschelmuth
- Location within Switzerland Location within Canton of Fribourg
- Coordinates: 46.880282°N 7.135002°E
- Country: Switzerland
- Canton: Fribourg
- District: See
- Municipality: Gurmels

Population (2000)
  - Total: 293
- Time zone: UTC+01:00 (CET)
  - Summer (DST): UTC+02:00 (CEST)
- SFOS number: 2263
- ISO 3166 code: CH-FR
- Website

Guschelmuth is a former municipality in the See district of the canton of Fribourg, Switzerland. Since 2003 it has been part of the municipality of Gurmels. German-speaking Guschelmuth lies 9 km north of Fribourg and consists of Kleinguschelmuth and Grossguschelmuth, which were separate municipalities until they merged in 1978.

== History ==
Guschelmuth is first mentioned in 1267 as Cursilimou. A grave from the Hallstatt period was found west of Kleinguschelmuth, and a few Roman tiles south of the Bois de Palud. In the 14th century Guschelmuth was a fief of the counts of Thierstein. From 1442 it belonged to the Alte Landschaft (Old Territory) of Fribourg, in the Hospital banner (Spitalpanner).

Kleinguschelmuth and Grossguschelmuth always belonged to the parish of Gurmels. Since 1801 Grossguschelmuth has had a chapel dedicated to John the Baptist. Between 1803 and 1848 Guschelmuth was assigned to several districts: from 1803 to 1830 it belonged to the district of Fribourg, from 1831 to 1847 to the German district (Deutscher Bezirk), and since 1848 it has been part of the See district. Agriculture is still the main source of income in Guschelmuth.

Guschelmuth had 186 inhabitants in 1850, 222 in 1900, 259 in 1950 and 293 in 2000.

== Bibliography ==
- P. Boschung, "Die Alte Landschaft Freiburg", in Beiträge zur Heimatkunde des Sensebezirks, 52, 1982, pp. 253–294
- M. Boschung, "Die territoriale Umgestaltung des Kantons Freiburg zwischen 1798 und 1848", in Freiburger Geschichtsblätter, 76, 1999, pp. 145–188
- H. Schöpfer, Der Seebezirk II (Die Kunstdenkmäler des Kantons Freiburg, 5), 2000, pp. 369–373
