= Resistance Committee (Ukraine) =

- Комітет Спротиву (Ukrainian)
- The Black flag of Anarchy
- Founded: 24 February 2022
- Country: Ukraine
- Type: Platoon
- Size: 50–75
- Part of: Territorial Defense Forces
- Engagements: Russian invasion of Ukraine: Battle of Kyiv; Battle of Kharkiv; Battle of Svatove–Kreminna; Battle of Bakhmut

Commanders
- Cofounder: Yurii Samoilenko † (10 September 2022)
- Spokesperson: Dmitry Petrov † (24 February 2022-19 April 2023)

The Resistance Committee (Ukrainian: Комітет Спротиву; RC), also known as the Black Headquarters or Anti-Authoritarian Platoon, was a Ukrainian detachment made up of anarchist, anti-authoritarian and anti-fascist volunteers. It was formed to fight against the Russian invasion of Ukraine as part of the Territorial Defense Forces (TDF).

Formed in Kyiv on the first day of the invasion, the Committee brought together several anarchist and anti-fascist groups that intended to resist the Russian advance. It initially fought in the Battle of Kyiv, before many of its members were transferred to the Eastern front, where some of its fighters have died. It also established a mutual aid network in order to supply its fighters and provide humanitarian aid to civilians.

It has defined itself as an anti-authoritarian and anti-imperialist organisation, and has demanded a number of reforms including mass debt relief, the introduction of a welfare system and the self-management of society.

== History ==
=== Formation ===
During the crisis that surrounded the Russian military buildup along the Ukrainian border, anarchists in the Ukrainian capital Kyiv began preparing for the predicted invasion. When the full-scale Russian invasion of Ukraine came on 24 February 2022, Ukrainian anarchists quickly formed a consensus on the need to resist it, despite initial disagreements over command structure. Together with a number of foreign volunteers – some of whom had lived in Ukraine since the Revolution of Dignity in 2014, or fought in Rojava during the Syrian Civil War – Ukrainian anarchists established the Resistance Committee (RC) in order to coordinate anarchist resistance to the invasion. They were soon joined by other leftists, including anti-fascists and democratic socialists.

Although initially unwilling to integrate into larger structures, on 28 February, the militant anarchist organisation Revolutionary Action decided to join the Resistance Committee, bringing 20 of its members into the unit. It was also joined by the anti-fascist football hooligan group Hoods Hoods Klan, which is made up of fans of FC Arsenal Kyiv. It was later joined by Black Flag Ukraine, despite some ideological differences between it and the Resistance Committee's founding members.

=== Combat operations ===
With an estimated 50–75 members, the Resistance Committee was integrated into the Territorial Defense Forces (TDF). Their fighters were initially concentrated in the Ukrainian capital during the Battle of Kyiv, but after the Russian withdrawal from Northern Ukraine, many of them were transferred to the Eastern front. On 2 March, one of their members Ihor Volokhov was killed by a Russian missile attack in the Battle of Kharkiv.

In March 2022, the Resistance Committee called for foreign volunteers to join them in the fight against the Russian invasion, invoking the examples of the International Brigades of the Spanish Civil War and the International Freedom Battalion of the Syrian Civil War. The result was the formation of an "international detachment" within the TDF.

Since the outbreak of the war, the Resistance Committee has maintained a consistent social media presence, posted a number of online photos and videos showing their fighters on the frontlines. In one video, they declared their support for four Belarusian anarchists that had been served with lengthy prison sentences over charges of terrorism. On 20 May, the Resistance Committee published its manifesto, which defined the organisation as a "space for dialogue and coordination of anarchist, libertarian and anti-authoritarian initiatives" in Ukraine. It declared its three main functions in the conflict to be active combat operations, public relations and volunteering.

=== Mutual aid operations ===
Supported by people outside Ukraine, the Resistance Committee also helped to establish a mutual aid network, known as Operation Solidarity. From May to July 2022, Operation Solidarity split, with the majority of its members adopting the name Solidarity Collectives. These non-combatant organisation were dedicated to providing protective gear to frontline fighters and humanitarian aid to civilians. According to Greek journalist Alexis Daloumis:

[Operation] Solidarity and the Resistance Committee have been organically linked since the beginning. Before the war, anarchists from different sides (and in coordination with other antifascists) got together and decided that some would join the armed resistance and some will handle logistics. They have been administered, however, autonomously from each other, and Operation Solidarity also supports other groups and individual anarchists within the armed resistance in various other places of Ukraine.

== Ideology ==
=== Anti-authoritarianism ===
The Resistance Committee declared their aim to be the unification of all anti-authoritarians in the defense of Ukraine, considering resistance to the invasion to be "the continuation of the struggle for people's freedom from all authoritarianism". They draw inspiration from Nestor Makhno's Revolutionary Insurgent Army of Ukraine (RIAU) and the Spanish Confederación Nacional del Trabajo (CNT).

First established by anarchists, the Resistance Committee came to be a broad tent that included different tendencies of left-wing politics. According to Dmitry Petrov, then known by the pseudonym "Ilya", "not everyone in our unit identifies as an anarchist. The more important thing is that a lot of people organized spontaneously to help each other, to guard their neighborhoods and towns and villages and to confront the occupiers with Molotov [cocktails]". In the last point of their manifesto, they called for "common access to the means of self-defense as a condition of freedom and opportunity to protect oneself from aggressors."

=== Anti-capitalism ===
Domestically, the Resistance Committee has demanded mass debt relief, free public transport, welfare, and the extension of Ukrainian citizenship to foreign volunteers; while internationally, they have demanded the cancellation of the country's external debt by foreign powers. They also outlined their goals for Ukrainian society, which they envisioned as consisting of a network of popular assemblies and trade unions that can self-manage community resources.

=== Anti-fascism ===
Unlike far-right detachments such as the Azov Brigade, the Resistance Committee is made up of members who reject fascism. They likewise reject what they see as a "false anti-fascism" espoused by Vladimir Putin's government, which they consider to be a "homophobic, sexist and xenophobic regime [...] similar to fascism". To Petrov, "it is clear that the Kremlin's propaganda about 'fighting Nazis in Ukraine' is just a smoke screen to disguise greed for power and the desire to establish harsh authoritarian rule."

=== Anti-imperialism ===
To the Resistance Committee, the invasion was a direct manifestation of "the imperialist policies of Putin's regime." Petrov considered it necessary for the invasion to be defeated, "both for the sake of justice and the basic survival of Ukrainian society." Although it supports non-combatant activists, the Resistance Committee rejects pacifism, with Petrov declaring "[w]hen the enemy is attacking you, it is very difficult take an antiwar pacifist stance, and this is because you need to defend yourself."

The Resistance Committee is critical of the Ukrainian state, but considers "Russian imperialist aggression" to be a greater threat and rejects the idea that Russian intervention can solve the country's problems. To Petrov, "taking sides against Russian aggression [...] does not necessarily mean solidarizing with Ukrainian state." Volunteers of the Resistance Committee have rejected that they are fighting for the Ukrainian state, and have instead claimed to be fighting for the Ukrainian people.

They also declared their intention to support the opposition in Russia and in Belarus. Their manifesto stated that: "Until the nest of tyranny in Moscow is removed, the whole region will constantly face harassment against its freedom. [...] Every local tyrant, suppressing his rebellious people, will be assisted by the tsar of Moscow." It concluded by declaring: "We want to set ourselves and our neighbours free. It means that we should put an end to Putin’s regime."

== See also ==
- Combat Organization of Anarcho-Communists
- Kastuś Kalinoŭski Regiment
- Order of battle for the Russian invasion of Ukraine

== Bibliography ==
- Arbide Aza, Hibai; Cardoso, Adriana (15 March 2022). "Anarquistas ucranios toman las armas contra la invasión rusa" [Ukrainian anarchists take up arms against the Russian invasion]. El País (in Spanish). Lviv. ISSN 0213-4608.
- Askew, Joshua (10 June 2022). "Meet the motley crew of anarchists and anti-fascists fighting Russia in Ukraine". Euronews.
- Fuentes, Federico; Dudin, Vitaly (6 April 2022). "Ukrainian socialist: 'Demilitarisation lies in stopping Russia's war machine now'". Green Left. No. 1341. pp. 12–16. ISSN 1036-126X.
- Hürtgen, Renate (2022). "What is the nature of the war we see in Ukraine?". Journal of Contemporary Central and Eastern Europe. 20 (3): 455–464. doi:10.1080/25739638.2022.2141955. ISSN 2573-9638. S2CID 253356594.
- Lord, Tom (3 March 2022). "Ukrainian Anarchists Mobilize for Armed Defense, Draw Solidarity from Abroad as Russia Invades". Militant Wire.
- Lord, Tom (24 May 2022). "Anti-Authoritarian Collective of Ukraine's Territorial Defense Forces Releases New Manifesto". Militant Wire.
- Lord, Tom (31 May 2022). ""Defensive war as an act of popular resistance...": Exclusive Interview with an Anarchist Fighter of the Territorial Defense Forces of Ukraine". Militant Wire.
- Ludwig, Mike (5 March 2022). "War Is Forcing Ukrainian Leftists to Make Difficult Decisions About Violence". Truthout.
