= Solidarity Collectives =

- Колективи солідарності
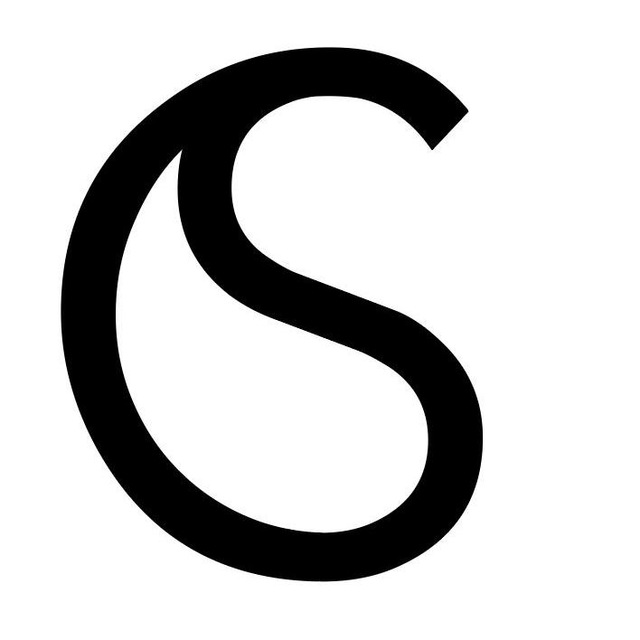
- Abbreviation: SC, SolCol
- Predecessor: Operation "Solidarity"
- Formation: 2022
- Founded at: Ukraine
- Type: Volunteer network
- Website: www.solidaritycollectives.org/en

Solidarity Collectives (SC, also known as SolCol; Ukrainian: Колективи солідарності) is a volunteer network that specialises in supporting left-wing combatants serving in the Armed Forces of Ukraine, as well as providing humanitarian aid to people and animals living in front-line areas. Among the key principles emphasised by SolCol are anti-authoritarianism, anti-imperialism, anti-fascism, and solidarity with like-minded initiatives.

The logo of the Solidarity Collectives features a ligature of the Latin letters S and C, standing for Solidarity Collectives.

In October 2023, the Ministry of Information of the Republic of Belarus added the Solidarity Collectives' Telegram channel to its "List of Extremist Materials."

== History ==
The predecessor of the Solidarity Collectives was an initiative called Operation "Solidarity", which emerged on 23 February 2022, following Vladimir Putin's speech on the eve of Russia's full-scale invasion of Ukraine. The initiative united activists from various left-wing circles — primarily anarchist, as well as Marxist, broad socialist, feminist, environmentalist, and trade union movements. Some of them joined the front lines, while others committed themselves to providing logistical and material support. Many of the fighters with anti-authoritarian views later joined the Resistance Committee. From May to July 2022, Operation "Solidarity" split into several organisations, one of which became the Solidarity Collectives themselves.

Since June 2022, the Solidarity Collectives have been assisting soldiers with equipment needs, and since early 2023, they have been travelling to front-line cities on humanitarian missions. In February 2023, SolCol carried out its first trip to Lyman, delivering warm clothing, heaters, chargers, and other humanitarian aid to local residents. After the destruction of the Kakhovka Dam by Russian forces on 6 June 2023, members of the Solidarity Collectives arrived in Nikopol, where they purchased drinking water for the local vocational school and supplied large water containers for public use. The Collectives have also conducted humanitarian missions in Kryvyi Rih, Dobropillia, Kupiansk, and other cities.

At the end of April 2024, the Solidarity Collectives took part in an event in Odesa, which involved the planting of trees in memory of international volunteers who had fallen in the Russo-Ukrainian war. The event aimed to honour the memory of Dmitry Petrov, a Russian anarchist, Finbar Cafferkey, an Irish socialist, and Cooper Andrews, an American activist.

On 23 June 2024, the Solidarity Collectives held a public event marking their second anniversary. The celebration featured a photo exhibition documenting their humanitarian missions, a really really freemarket, and a discussion on self-organisation during wartime, with participation from fighters affiliated with anarchist groups such as the Ecological Platform and the Resistance Committee.

Throughout their history, the Solidarity Collectives have cooperated with a range of Ukrainian and international left-wing initiatives, including Anarchist Black Cross, Direct Action, Social Movement, as well as several foreign trade unions — notably France's General Confederation of Labour (CGT) and Poland's Workers' Initiative — and some political internationals such as the International Workers' Unity (IWU–FI) and International Workers' League (IWL–FI).

== Structure and Areas of Activity ==
The Solidarity Collectives have no leader and adhere to a horizontal organisational structure. Representatives of the network identify three main areas of their work: military, humanitarian, and media.

=== Military work ===
From the beginning of the war, the Solidarity Collectives have described supplying anti-authoritarian fighters with everything necessary as their primary task. Through donations, the volunteer initiative provides soldiers with body armour, helmets, thermal imagers, drones, and other essential equipment. Around one hundred fighters receive regular assistance from SolCol. Since June 2024, soldering and assembling drones have become part of the organisation's military activity.

=== Humanitarian work ===
Humanitarian work was not a core activity at the outset but emerged when the Collectives accumulated a large stock of items that were unnecessary for the military but useful for civilians. The network operates at least four warehouses and a fleet of vehicles used to deliver humanitarian aid to frontline areas. The Collectives have organised humanitarian convoys to Bucha, Bilohorodka, Kramatorsk, and other cities, delivering aid like medication, clothing, food, sleeping bags, mattresses, gas cylinders, and electronic equipment.

=== FPV workshop ===
The FPV Workshop is dedicated to creating and providing FPV drones for fighters, enhancing their efficiency and safety on the front lines. Solcol does not only supply drones but also organizes skill-sharing to anyone interested in using them to improve their preparedness. This is their contribution to the technological support of the Ukrainian resistance, helping fighters in the field operate faster and more safely.

=== Media work ===
SolCol conducts active media outreach, promoting ideas about the importance of supporting Ukraine in the Russian–Ukrainian war, reporting on war crimes committed by the Russian army, and highlighting the activities of the left in Ukraine during wartime. The group also spreads ideas of anti-authoritarianism and social equality. To do so, Solidarity Collectives use social media, interviews, and participate in debates and conferences.
