= Tamara Funiciello =

Swiss politician (born 1990)

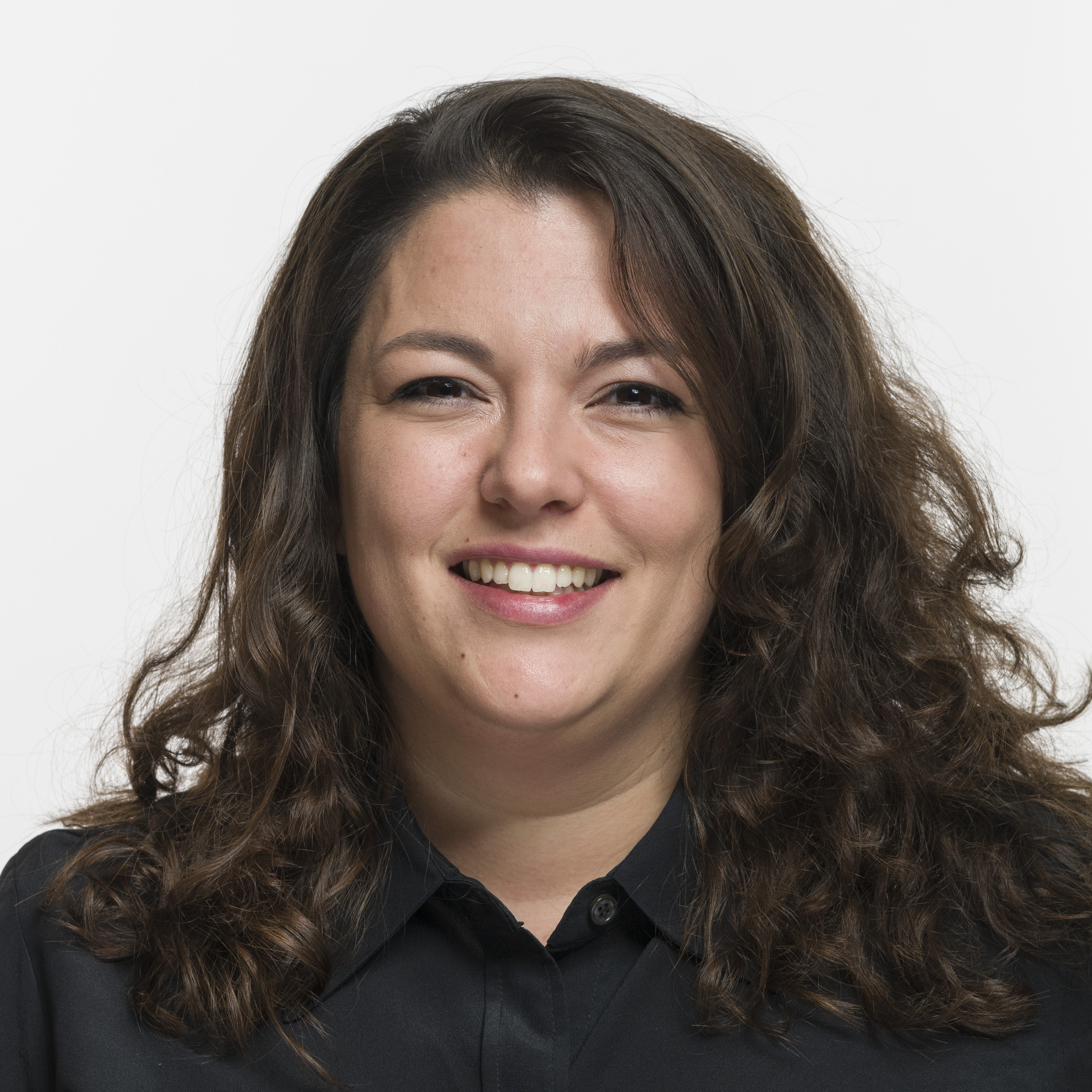
- Official portrait, 2019

Member of National Council
- Incumbent
- Assumed office 2 December 2019
- Constituency: Canton of Bern

Member of Grand Council of Bern
- In office 1 January 2017 – 31 May 2018

Personal details
- Born: Tamara Funiciello; 20 March 1990 (age 36) Bern, Switzerland
- Citizenship: Switzerland; Italy
- Party: Social Democratic Party
- Other party: Young Socialists Switzerland (former)
- Occupation: Politician, political activist and consultant
- Website: Official website Parliament website

Tamara Funiciello (Italian pronunciation: [funiˈtʃɛllo]; born 20 March 1990) is a Swiss politician who currently serves as member of the National Council since 2019 for the Social Democratic Party.

== Early life and education ==
Tamara Funiciello was born into a working-class family, her mother being a retail worker and her father a factory worker. She was born in Bern, but grew up in Sardinia, Italy. She attended primary school in Bosa, Sardinia. At the turn of the millennium, the family moved to Bern again. She attended high school in Neuenegg, Bern. After graduating from high school, she began studying international relations at the University of Geneva, later she transferred to the University of Bern to study history and social sciences. She worked in several areas before becoming as a secretary of the workers union at Unia in 2013. She decided to get engaged for the workers rights after her father was dismissed as a factory worker in 2011.

== Political career ==
Funiciello started her political career as a member of the board of directors of the non-presiding city of Bern Juso, later she was president of the Juso Canton of Bern. She also served as a member of the management of the SP Canton Bern. She became the President of the Young Socialists of Switzerland (Juso) in 2016, a post she held until 2019. In the municipal elections of the 25 March 2018, she was elected to represent the SP in the Grand Council of the Canton of Bern. After three years, she resigned from her position as President of the Juso at the end of August 2019. Her successor is Ronja Jansen. In the parliamentary elections on the 20 October 2019, Funiciello was elected to the Swiss National Council, where she became a member of the Legal Commission. On 29 February 2020, Funiciello was elected as co-president of the women's branch of the SP.

=== Political positions ===
She identifies as a Marxist and is inspired by Rosa Luxemburgs motto "To say what is, remains the most revolutionary act". Therefore, she prefers to defend the policies of the SP instead of making compromises. Also after having been elected as member of the Swiss National Council in 2019, she identified primarily as a workers union activist and only in a secondary role as a politician. She is a prominent women's rights activist and was a leading figure during the second nationwide women's strike in 2019 after the first of one in 1991. Besides she is also a member of the board of directors of the Swiss branch of European NGO for social justice Solidar. On 15 January 2021, she undertook godparenthood for Mikola Dziadok, activist and political prisoner from Belarus.

== Personal life ==
in June 2019, Funiciello first publicly commented on her sexuality and came out as bisexual. Her place of origin in Switzerland is Gurbrü. Funiciello played field hockey for the BSC Young Boys and also in the Swiss national team, with which she won gold at the European Championship in the C-Division.
