= Lana Chornohorska =

Ukrainian artist and anarchist activist (1999–2026)

- Лана Чорногорська
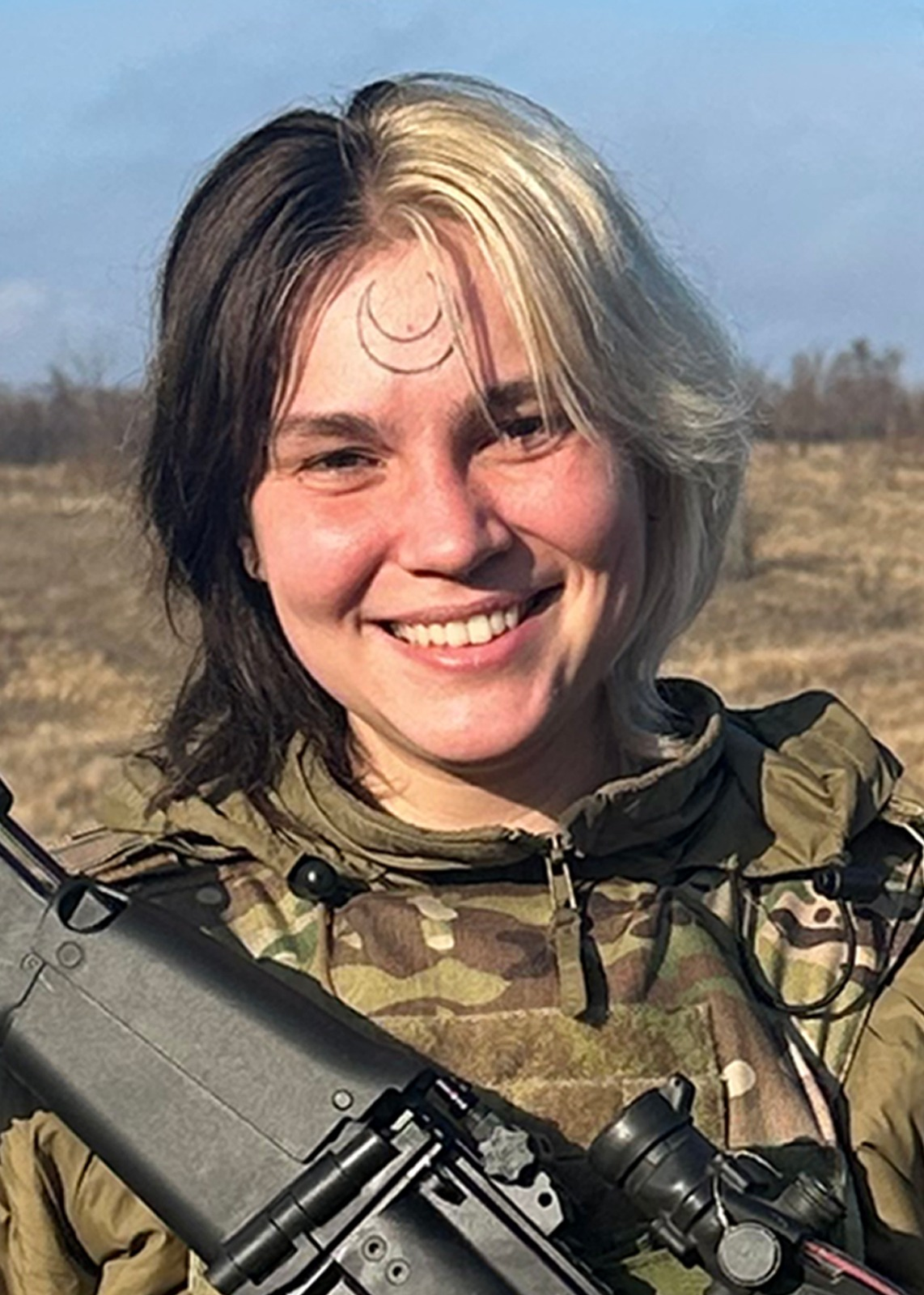
- Chornohorska in 2025

Personal details
- Born: 13 September 1999 Zaporizhzhia, Ukraine
- Died: 1 January 2026 (aged 26) Zaporizhzhia Oblast, Ukraine
- Cause of death: Killed in action
- Occupation: Journalist, artist, soldier
- Nickname: Sati

Military service
- Allegiance: Ukraine
- Branch/service: Ukrainian Volunteer Army
- Unit: Udachnyky
- Battles/wars: Russian invasion of Ukraine †

Lana Evgeniivna Chornohorska (Ukrainian: Лана Євгеніївна Чорногорська; 13 September 1999 – 1 January 2026), nicknamed Sati, was a Ukrainian journalist, artist and queer anarchist. She contributed to the magazine Liuk in Kharkiv, participated in the Ukrainian anarchist movement and engaged in the country's queer struggles. Following the Russian invasion of Ukraine, she joined the Ukrainian Volunteer Army as a drone operator and was killed by a Russian drone strike.

== Life and career ==
Lana Chornohorska was born in Zaporizhzhia on 13 September 1999. Around the age of 17, while already working as a journalist, she was noted by Ukrainian journalist Bohdan Lohvynenko for her assertive character; she was reportedly very demanding regarding the images taken by the journalism team, often being dissatisfied with the quality of the shots. A month later, she left her home to attend Book Forum Lviv; she then lived for a time at Lohvynenko's home in Kyiv, as he made his house available to her while he was away filming.

Chornohorska joined the anarchist and LGBT movements, being non-binary herself. She described her activism as "a large part of her world". She was also an artist and pursued a career in journalism across several locations, including Kharkiv, Lviv, and Kyiv. She was particularly fond of Kharkiv, which she called the city of her heart. Chornohorska, who studied in Dnipro for a time, began working for the Ukrainian magazine Liuk in 2020–2021, a publication based in Kharkiv.

Following the Russian invasion of Ukraine, she joined the Ukrainian Volunteer Army and became involved in both drone training and active drone combat duties. In 2024, she joined the Udachnyky unit and was noted for often leading the most dangerous missions.

On 1 January 2026, at the age of 26, Chornohorska was killed on the front in a Russian drone strike. Her funeral was held on 6 January. It was announced that her body would be repatriated for burial.

== See also ==
- Dmitry Petrov
