= Ihar Alinevich =

Belarusian anarchist political prisoner (born 1983)

- Ігар Аліневіч
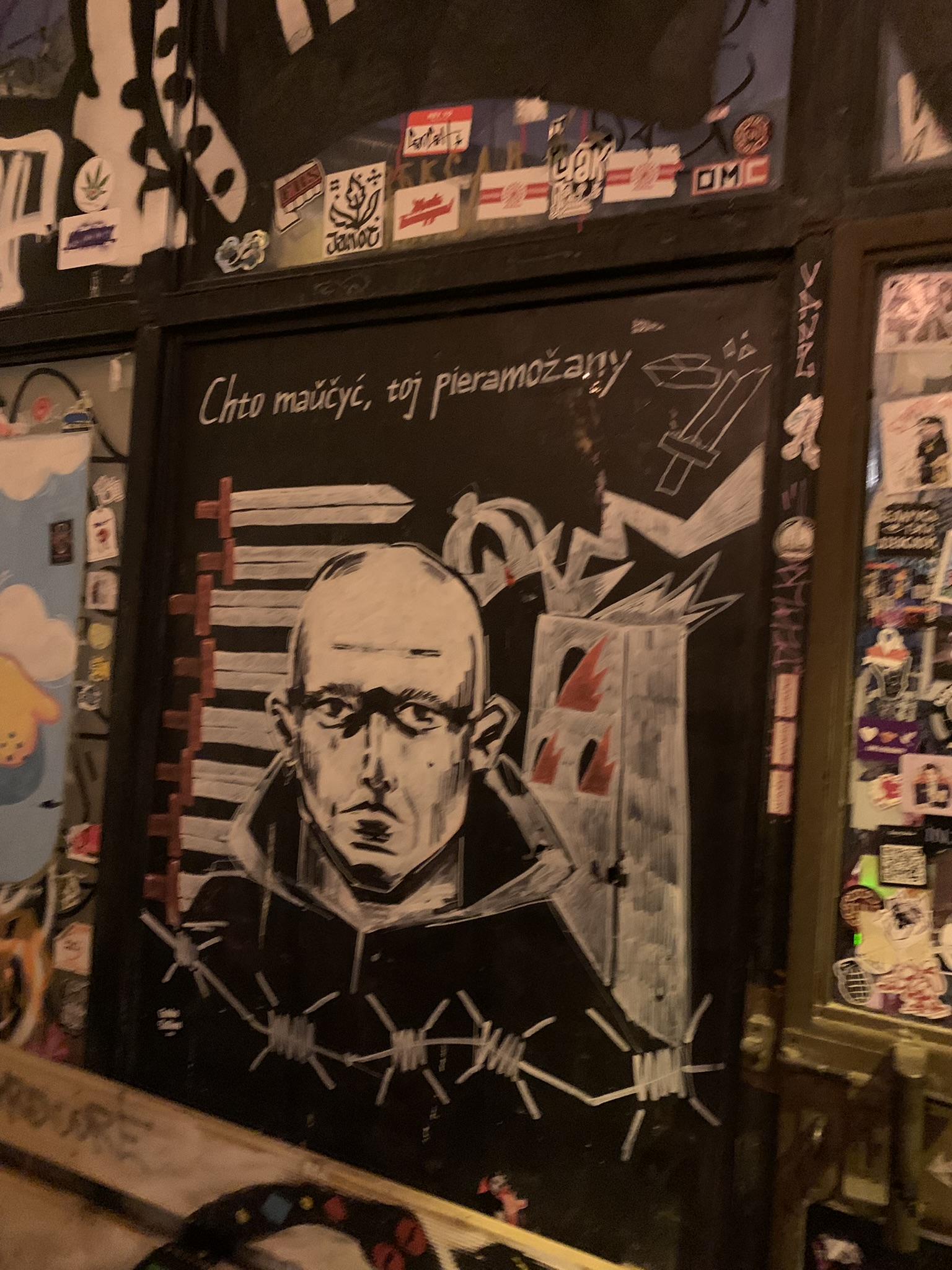
- Graffiti depicting Ihar Alinevich in Warsaw
- Born: 24 September 1983 (age 42)
- Citizenship: Belarus
- Education: BSUIR
- Occupation: Electronic engineer
- Movement: Anarchism

Ihar Uladzimiravich Alinevich (Belarusian: Ігар Уладзіміравіч Аліневіч; Russian: Игорь Владимирович Олиневич; Igor Vladimirovich Olinevich) is a Belarusian anarchist political prisoner. On 22 December 2021, he was sentenced by a Belarusian court to 20 years of prison.

== Biography ==
Ihar Vladimirovich Alinevich was born on 24 September 1983. He graduated from the Belarusian State University of Informatics and Radioelectronics as an electronic engineer. He worked on the creation of a Belarusian-Russian satellite. From adolescence he was interested in the history, theory and practice of anarchism.

=== Anarchist activities, kidnapping, 2011 trial ===
In 2009–2010 he took part in several anarchists actions in Minsk. After an action of solidarity with Russian anarchists at the Russian embassy in Minsk on 30 August 2010, Alinevich left for Russia, where he hid for some time.

Olinevich was detained by unknown persons in the shopping center "U Gorbushka" in Moscow on 28 November 2010. Later, Alinevich stated that he was illegally transported across the Belarusian-Russian border with a hat pulled over his eyes. The next day (according to other information – a day later) Alinevich's parents were informed that their son was in Minsk, in a KGB pre-trial detention center. The Russian newspaper Novaya Gazeta described Alinevich's arrest as abduction and an illegal special operation.

Initially, Alinevich was accused under Article 339 of the Criminal Code of the Republic of Belarus "Hooliganism" (part 2) for participating in a protest near the General Staff of the Armed Forces of the Republic of Belarus on 19 September 2009, and for an attack on the Russian embassy on the night of 30–31 August 2010 (on Alexander Lukashenko's birthday). Subsequently, he was also charged under Article 218 of the Criminal Code of the Republic of Belarus "Intentional destruction or damage to property" (parts 2 and 3), and an attack on a casino, a bank and the center for isolation of offenders on Akrestsin Street was added to the list of charges. Together with Alinevich, Mikola Dziadok and Alexander Frantskevich were involved in this case. Alinevich admitted that he took part in a peaceful protest near the General Staff, but denied the involvement of anarchists in the attack on the Russian embassy.

On 27 May 2011 Alinevich was found guilty by the Zavodskoy District Court of Minsk and sentenced to 8 years in a maximum security prison. Initially, he was held in prison No. 10 in Novopolotsk (Vitebsk region), located in an ecologically polluted area near two large chemical plants. Alinevich was allowed one meeting with his mother every six months, provided that there were no violations, from January to 14 July 2012, he was allowed 3 phone calls. In 2012, Alinevich was sent to solitary confinement for refusing to write a petition for clemency. In 2013, Alinevich's mother (a professor of economic sciences) was fired from the Belarusian State Economic University, where she had worked for over 30 years. According to her, this was related to the case of her son. In 2014, Alinevich was transferred to the "Vitba-3" prison (Vitebsk district of the Vitebsk region).

While still in pre-trial detention, Alinevich began to write a book "On The Way To Magadan" about himself and about prison life, which was published in 2013. Soon after its publication, the book received the František Alekhnovich Award for the best work written in prison.

Alinevich was recognized as a political prisoner by Belarusian and international human rights organizations. By 2015, he remained one of the last political prisoners in the Republic of Belarus. On 22 August 2015, Alinevich was released by the decision of Alexander Lukashenko, along with five other political prisoners. The liberation had an international resonance and was seen as a step towards normalizing relations with the European Union. After his release, Alinevich emigrated. In 2016, Alinevich was recognized as a laureate of the Viktor Ivashkevich Human Rights Award (nomination "For Personal Courage").

=== 2020 arrest, terrorism charge ===
On the night of 28–29 October 2020, Belarusian border guards detained Ihar Alinevich and three more anarchists – Dmitry Dubovsky, Dmitry Rezanovich and Siarhei Ramanau in the Yelʹsk District of the Gomel Region near the Belarus–Ukraine border. They were charged under Article 289 of the Criminal Code of the Republic of Belarus "Terrorism", which provides for punishment up to the death penalty, as well as under Article 295 of the Criminal Code of the Republic of Belarus "Illegal arms trafficking". The anarchists were accused of setting fire to four cars near the building of the prosecutor's office in Salihorsk (Minsk Region) and the local branch of the State Committee for Forensic Expertise.

On 22 December 2021, the Minsk Regional Court sentenced Alinevich to 20 years of prison. The Viasna Human Rights Centre, the Belarusian Helsinki Committee, the Belarusian PEN Center, the Belarusian Association of Journalists and several other human rights organizations declared him to be a political prisoner.

== Bibliography ==
- Alinevich, Igor (2013). "Еду в Магадан". Sensus Novus (in Russian). Радикальная теория и практика. p. 164. Archived from the original on 24 January 2021.
