= Anarchism in Belarus =

Anarchism in Belarus refers to anarchist movements in the Republic of Belarus and its historically associated territories within the Russian Empire. Anarchists in Belarus began in the 18th century when multiple anarchist organizations organizing separately against the Tsarist Russia. During the Russian Civil War anarchists organized into multiple anarchist federations and fought against the Red Army and seized control over sections of Belarus. Anarchists and other leftists across the former Russian Empire began an uprising against the Bolshevik government called by anarchists as the "Third Russian Revolution" most prominently in the uprising Russian and Belarusians staged a revolt during the Kronstadt rebellion. Belarusian and Russian anarchists would seize control over the Soviet Navy and nearly overthrow the Bolshevik government. However, Bolshevik repression and inability for the movement to organize effectively would lead to the uprisings' failing.

Anarchist activities would weaken during the Soviet era, as the government of the Soviet Union began implementing oppressive policies against anarchists, and Marxism–Leninism became the official state ideology. Anarchist activities would increase during the 1980s and 1990s as the Soviet Union began to weaken and began protesting against the government. After the dissolution of the Soviet Union, anarchists have had an increasingly more important role in Belarusian politics, with the anarchist movement in Belarus exploding in the 21st century, playing an important role in various movements. For example, anarchists have played an active role in organizing, participating and protesting in the 2020 Belarusian protests.

== History ==
=== Russian Empire ===
The first anarchist group in the Russian Empire appeared in Bialystok, Grodno Province, in the spring of 1903. Many of the first anarchists in Belarus were dissatisfied with the moderate positions and "neutrality" of existing socialist parties, such as the Jewish Labour Bund, the Russian Social Democratic Labour Party (RSDLP), and the Socialist Revolutionary Party. Anarchists demanded the destruction of the state, which included the monarchy and the parliamentary republic. These were both deemed tools of class oppression by anarchists. Anarchists did not view democracy as a viable alternative, as the word meant "kratiya", or power, specifically of the bourgeoisie.

Expropriation and the provocation of individual terror created a halo of the "defenders of the working class" around anarchists, and were used as some of their most decisive tactics. Though workers from Bialystok joined the anarchist federation on a massive scale, the anarchists never achieved anything more than local economic victories.

=== Russian Revolution ===
In 1917, the leaders of the anarchist movement in Saint Petersburg and Kronstadt, were either inspired by Belarus, or participated in the anarchist movement there. These leaders included Joseph Blakhman-Solntsev, Konstantin Akashev, Efim Yarchuk, and others. Anarchists, along with the Bolsheviks and the Left Essers, became the leading force of the October Revolution. Soon, Vladimir Lenin's party would even adopt the name "communist" from Kropotkinites to gain popularity. However, Lenin later renamed the party "Communist Bolsheviks" to distinguish it from anarchist-communists and Esser-communists.

The united front of all of these underground Soviet parties was preserved until early 1919. Around that time, anarchist Communism saw competition from the Communist Party, and the Bolsheviks managed to limit the influence of the anarchist movement. However, legal and semi-legal anarchist circles continued to operate in Belarus until the early 1920s. Eventually, however, the Councils of People's Self-Government, which was the dream of Peter Kropotkin's supporters, was converted by the party's bureaucracy into its auxiliary bodies. Many anarchists became exiles and political isolators.

=== Post-Soviet Belarus ===
The revival of anarchism was already underway during the years of perestroika. In the spring of 1991, Gomel anarchists took part in a citywide strike, and encouraged workers of the "Palesdruk" factory to join in. In the summer of 1992, at the initiative of Aleh Novikaŭ, activists from Minsk, Homiel, and Śvietłahorsk joined the Federation of Anarchists of Belarus (FAB).

On October 6, 1992, on International Unemployment Day, anarchists in Homiel held an unsanctioned rally, which ended in arrests and clashes with police. The same year, the "Union of the Unemployed" was created with the participation of Gomel anarchists. Agitation campaigns were also organized at businesses in the city. The Anarchy newspaper, the first anarchist newspaper in Belarus, was first published in Homiel in 1993.

In 1995, the anti-party group "Čyrvony Žond" was formed in Minsk. It would go on to play a significant role in the development of anarchist movements in Belarus.

The anarchist newspaper Navinki, which had been circulated illegally since its creation in 1998, was officially registered in 1999 as a result of the "Legalize It" campaign. At the same time, Čyrvony Žond, which initially issued Navinki, was banned in Belarus.

The environmental campaign "Viasiołka" was launched in 1998 with the participation of Belarusian anarchists. The campaign was directed against plans for the construction of the Astraviec Nuclear Power Plant. FAB activists helped form the independent environmental initiative "Ekasupraciŭ", which accepted responsibility for the organization of the entire campaign. The initiative drew support from employees of the National Academy of Sciences of Belarus, as well as members of the Russian environmental movement Rainbow Keepers. Viasiołka began publishing its own newspaper, covering topics that dealt with nuclear energy and radioecology. From 1998 to 1999, several seminars on the expediency of the construction of the power plant were organized by scientists. In the summer of 1998, activists from Ekasupraciŭ organized a "March for Nuclear Free Belarus" on the site in Mahiloŭ Region, where the power plant was to be constructed.

==== 21st century ====
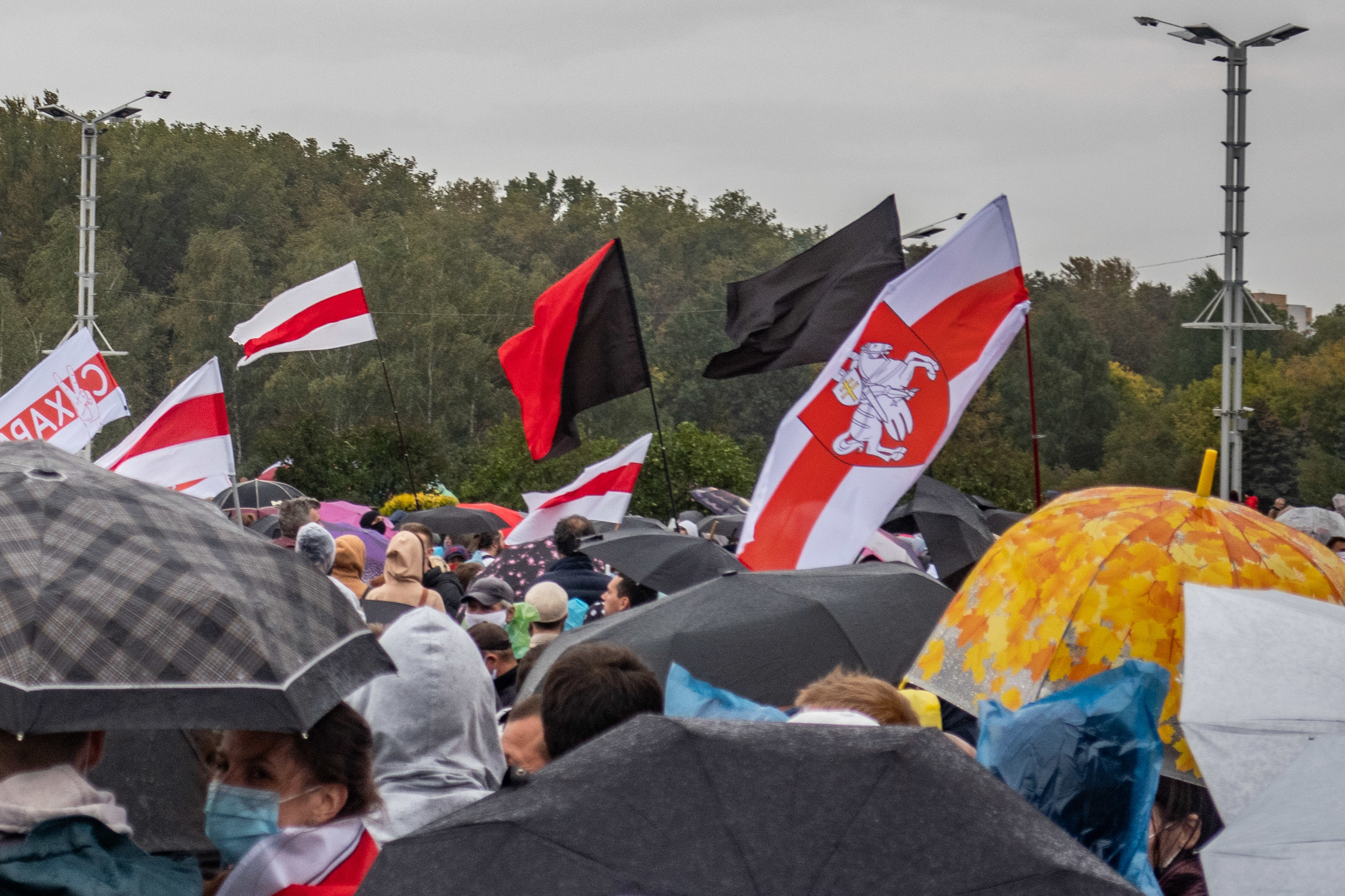
Anarchist flags during protests in Minsk, 27 September 2020

Anarchists are playing an increasingly more important role in Belarusian politics, with the anarchist movement, just like the global anarchist movement exploding in the 21st century. Anarchists have led and been active role organizing and participating in the Belarusian protests. Anarchists actively participated in the protests against Alexander Lukashenko. They repeatedly marched under red-black and black flags with other protesters and participated in road closures. They also scattered flyers. "Pramen'" group called for active resistance "against dictatorship for the direct democracy" and made political demands. Belarusian branch of "Anarchist Black Cross" called for international solidarity with Belarus.

On October 12, Belarusian deputy interior minister Hienadź Kazakievič named anarchists among the organizers of the mass protests.

Many anarchists were detained, some of them were charged with criminal charges. It was reported that police officers testified against them in courts using balaclavas or masks and under changed names. The "Anarchist Black Cross" claimed that one of the activists was tortured in SIZO KGB by a stun gun in order to collaborate and testify. One Minsk resident had even reportedly been beaten by police and forced to confess to involvement in the anarchist movement and the administration of their groups on social media.

On October 28, 2020, 4 Belarusian anarchist activists (Ihar Alinievič, Dźmitry Razanovič, Siarhei Ramanau, Dźmitry Duboǔski) were arrested near the Belarusian-Ukrainian border. The government and state media accused them of terrorism. They were charged under criminal code articles 289 (terrorism; up to the death penalty) and 295 (arms trafficking; up to 12 years in prison).

On November 12, 2020, anarchist activist and journalist Mikoła Dziadok was arrested in a safe house in Asipovičy District. His Telegram channel was captured by the police. He was beaten during the arrest. "Anarchist Black Cross" group claimed that he was tortured in order to give access to his computer data. Dziadok was released from prison and de facto deported to Lithuania in September 2025 along with fifty other Belarusian political prisoners after American-Belarusian negotiations.

On 5 March 2021, Ministry of internal affairs of Belarus reported arrest of seven activists of the anarcho-communist organization "Revolutionary Action" in Brest Region, calling them members of "international criminal organization".

== See also ==
- Category:Belarusian anarchists
- List of anarchist movements by region
- Anarchism in Russia
- Anarchism in Ukraine
