= Commons (magazine) =

Left-wing Ukrainian magazine (founded 2009)

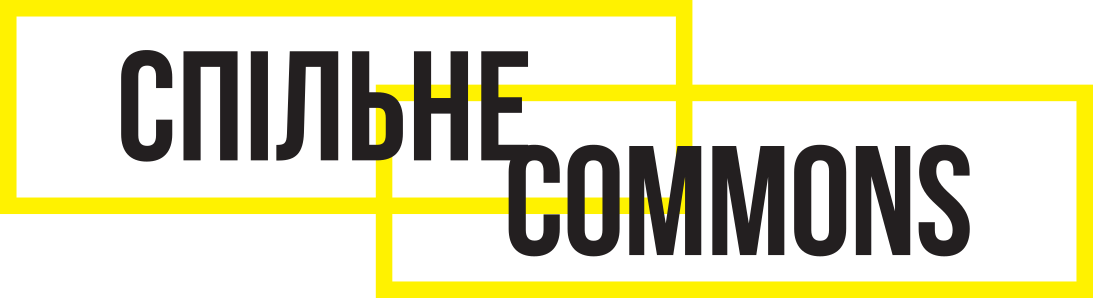
- Categories: Politics, economics, history, culture
- Founded: March 24, 2009
- First issue: 2010
- Country: Ukraine
- Based in: Kyiv
- Language: English, Russian, Ukrainian
- Website: commons.com.ua

Spilne | Commons: Journal of Social Criticism (Ukrainian: Спільне; Spilne) is a left-wing Ukrainian magazine established in 2009 that focuses on politics, economics, history, and culture.

== History and overview ==
The idea to create a journal originated in the liva_dumka network (left-wing thought) – a milieu of young left-wing researchers, activists, and students, mostly from the National University of Kyiv-Mohyla Academy. The core of the community was made up of young scholars who grew up in independent Ukraine and were educated in Western universities.

The website was launched on March 24, 2009 and at the same time, the preparation of the first printed issue of the magazine began. The first issue was published in April 2010, as part of an international symposium around the publication of Loïc Wacquant's book Punishing the Poor. The periodicity of the printed journal was stated to be twice a year, but later practice did not correspond to this.

As of March 2023, the magazine has published twelve issues on various topics.

On the tenth anniversary of the magazine, the editors announced that the 12th issue would be the last in print, and that in the future, Commons would work only in an online format. However, in 2023, a special issue in English “The Russian Invasion and the Ukrainian Left” was published.

The magazine has organized or co-organized a number of conferences. In 2019, it launched the annual Feuerbach 11 conference that brings together researchers and activists to discuss Ukraine's socio-economic and political issues.

In 2023-24, several authors of Commons died at the frontline defending Ukraine from Russian invasion: journalist Evheny Osievsky, Russian anarchist Dmitry Petrov, and lawyer Yuriy Lebedev.

== Ideology and reception ==
The magazine's position is left-wing and anti-capitalist. The editorial board included Marxists, anarchists, and supporters of other left-wing traditions, but at the same time, the magazine distanced itself from Soviet Marxism-Leninism and declared from the moment of its foundation that “there are no Stalinists among us and there will be none.” The co-founders were guided by the ideas of Michael Burawoy about organic public sociology, and the publication's goal was to analyze social reality, not theoretical polemics between different left-wing traditions. Some editors are activists of the Social Movement organization. Previously, part of the editorial board participated in the activities of the student union Direct Action.

Emily S. Channell-Justice, in her dissertation on the Ukrainian left's participation in the Revolution of Dignity, argued that the magazine "presented a space for leftist criticism of global issues and events, regularly organizing conferences in Kyiv. Since then, however, a growing ideological split between Political Critique and Commons has detracted from a more robust discussion of the fate of the Ukrainian left, based on the impression that Commons authors present a more dogmatic, class-oriented position rather than promoting a broad, accessible leftist perspective."

Commons was a member of the Progressive International, but after the Russian invasion began in 2022, the magazine criticized the position of the organization and later left the International, stating it was ‘shameful’ the organization refused to “unequivocally condemn Russian aggression.”

According to Medico International, during the war, the magazine was "considered one of the most important left-wing voices in Ukrainian civil society."

After the Gaza war began, the magazine published a letter of solidarity with the Palestinian people, condemning Israel's occupation of the Palestinian territories, while also condemning Hamas' attacks on civilians.
