= Wileroltigen =

- Municipality
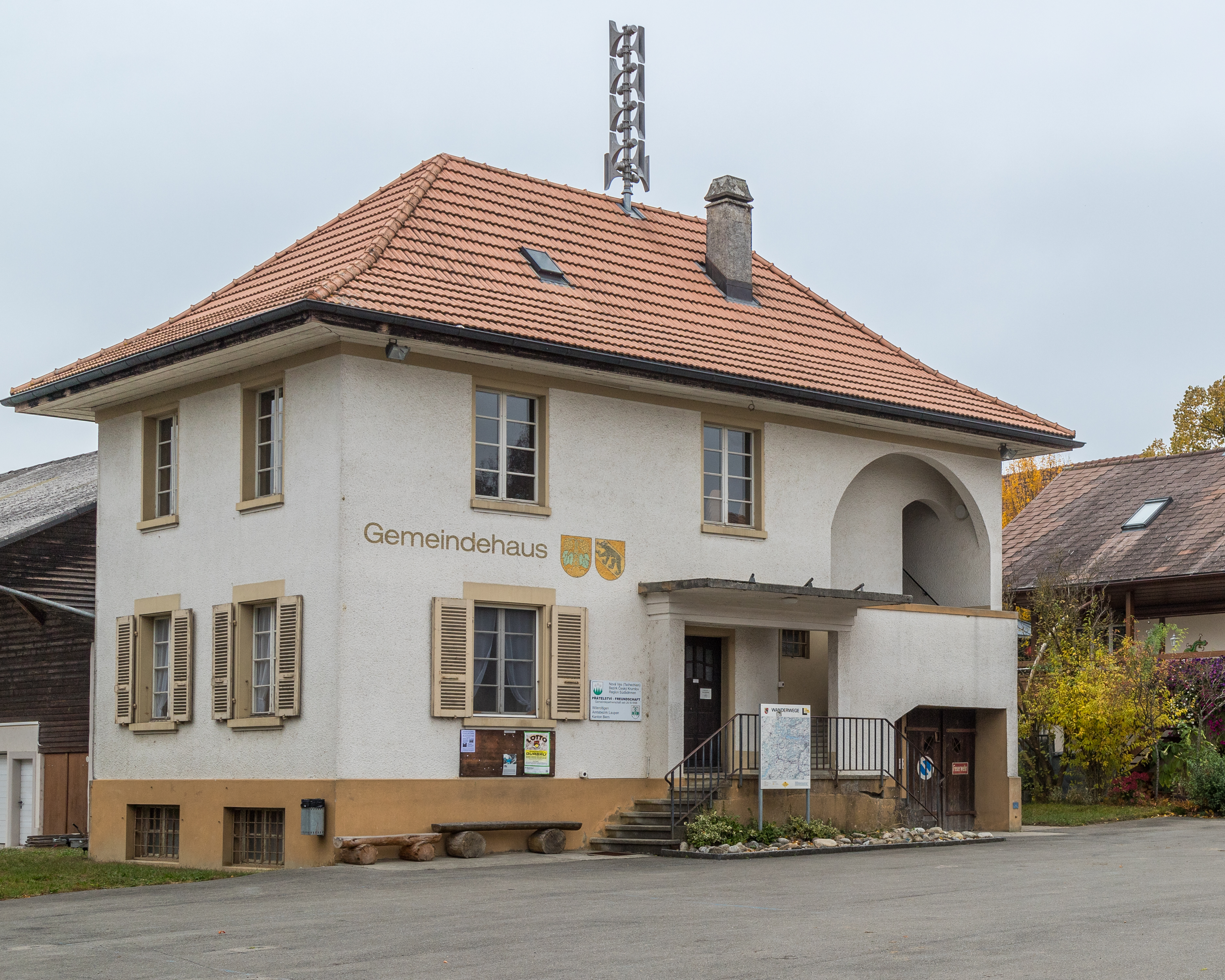
- Municipal administration building of Wileroltigen

- Flag Coat of arms
- Location of Wileroltigen
- Location within Switzerland Location within Canton of Bern
- Coordinates: 46°58′N 7°14′E
- Country: Switzerland
- Canton: Bern
- District: Bern-Mittelland

Government
  - Executive: Gemeinderat with 5 members
  - Mayor: Gemeindepräsident(in); Roger Perrottet (as of 2026)

Area
  - Total: 4.15 km^{2} (1.60 sq mi)
- Elevation: 513 m (1,683 ft)

Population (December 2020)
  - Total: 361
  - Density: 87.0/km^{2} (225/sq mi)
- Time zone: UTC+01:00 (CET)
  - Summer (DST): UTC+02:00 (CEST)
- Postal code: 3207
- SFOS number: 671
- ISO 3166 code: CH-BE
- Surrounded by: Ferenbalm, Golaten, Gurbrü, Kerzers (FR), Mühleberg
- Website: www.wileroltigen.ch

Wileroltigen is a municipality in the Bern-Mittelland administrative district in the canton of Bern in Switzerland.

== History ==
Aerial view (1962)

Wileroltigen is first mentioned in 1263 as Wiler sita prope Oltingen. The municipality was formerly known by its French name Ostranges, however, that name is no longer used.

During the Early Middle Ages the region around Wileroltigen belonged to St. Maurice's Abbey. In 962, the Abbey donated the land to Payerne Priory, which held it until the 13th century when the Herrschaft of Oltigen acquired the land. In 1412 the entire Herrschaft, including Wileroltigen, was absorbed by Bern. It was eventually combined with the villages of Gurbrü and Golaten to form a court in the bailiwick of Laupen. The village shared a bridge over the Saane/Sarine River with the village of Marfeldingen (part of the Mühleberg municipality) by 1325. During the 15th century, it was replaced with a ferry. After the Act of Mediation, in 1803, Wileroltigen was assigned to the Canton of Bern despite the protests of the Canton of Fribourg.

In 1528 both Wileroltigen and the parish church at Kerzers converted to the new faith of the Protestant Reformation and the village remained part of the parish of Kerzers. However, the village St. Mary Magdalene chapel was abandoned after the Reformation. A village school opened in 1659.

== Geography ==
Wileroltigen has an area of 4.15 km^{2} (1.60 sq mi). As of 2012, a total of 2.55 km^{2} (0.98 mi^{2}) or 61.3% is used for agricultural purposes, while 1.18 km^{2} (0.46 mi^{2}) or 28.4% is forested. Of the rest of the land, 0.27 km^{2} (0.10 mi^{2}) or 6.5% is settled (buildings or roads), 0.11 km^{2} (27 acres) or 2.6% is either rivers or lakes.

During the same year, housing and buildings made up 3.1% and transportation infrastructure made up 3.1%. Out of the forested land, 26.7% of the total land area is heavily forested and 1.7% is covered with orchards or small clusters of trees. Of the agricultural land, 47.6% is used for growing crops and 12.5% is pastures, while 1.2% is used for orchards or vine crops. All the water in the municipality is flowing water.

The municipality is located on the left bank of the Saane/Sarine River near where that river empties into the Aare River.

On 31 December 2009 Amtsbezirk Laupen, the municipality's former district, was dissolved. On the following day, 1 January 2010, it joined the newly created Verwaltungskreis Bern-Mittelland.

== Coat of arms ==
The blazon of the municipal coat of arms is Gules a Vine tree Vert propped and fructed Or issuant from a Mount of 3 Coupaux of the last.

== Demographics ==
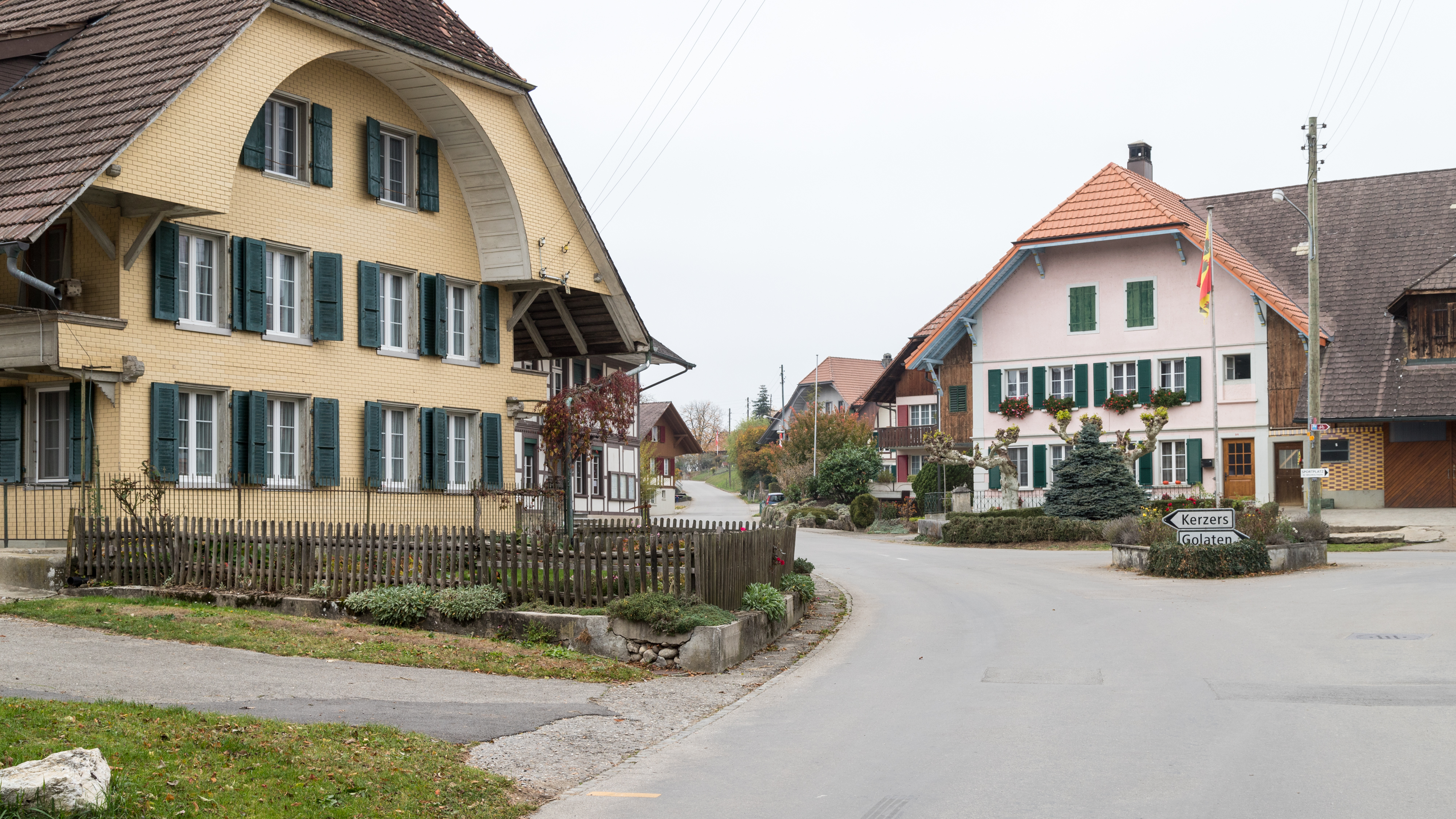
Farmhouses Oberdorf

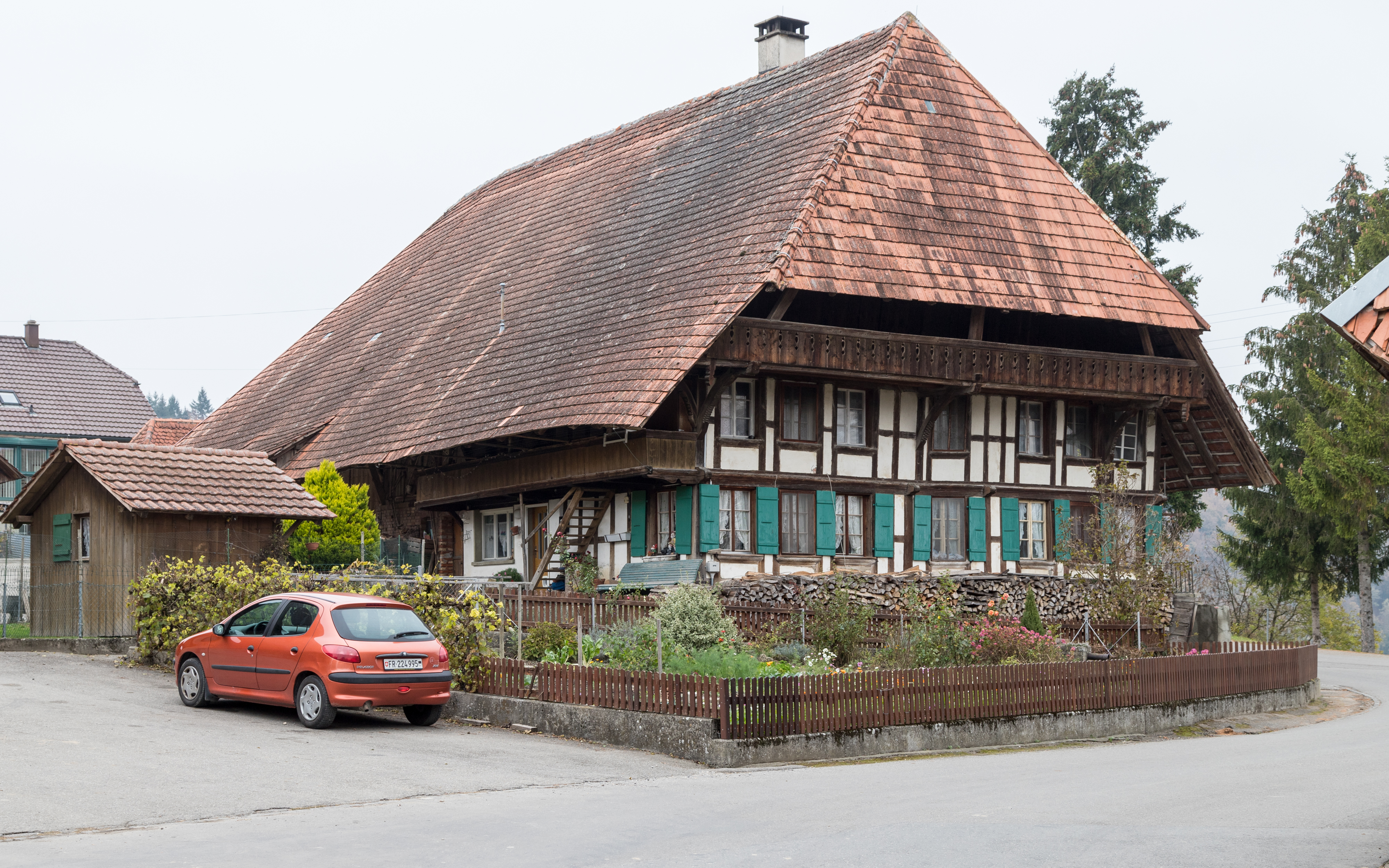
Farmhouse "Im Egge", built 1780

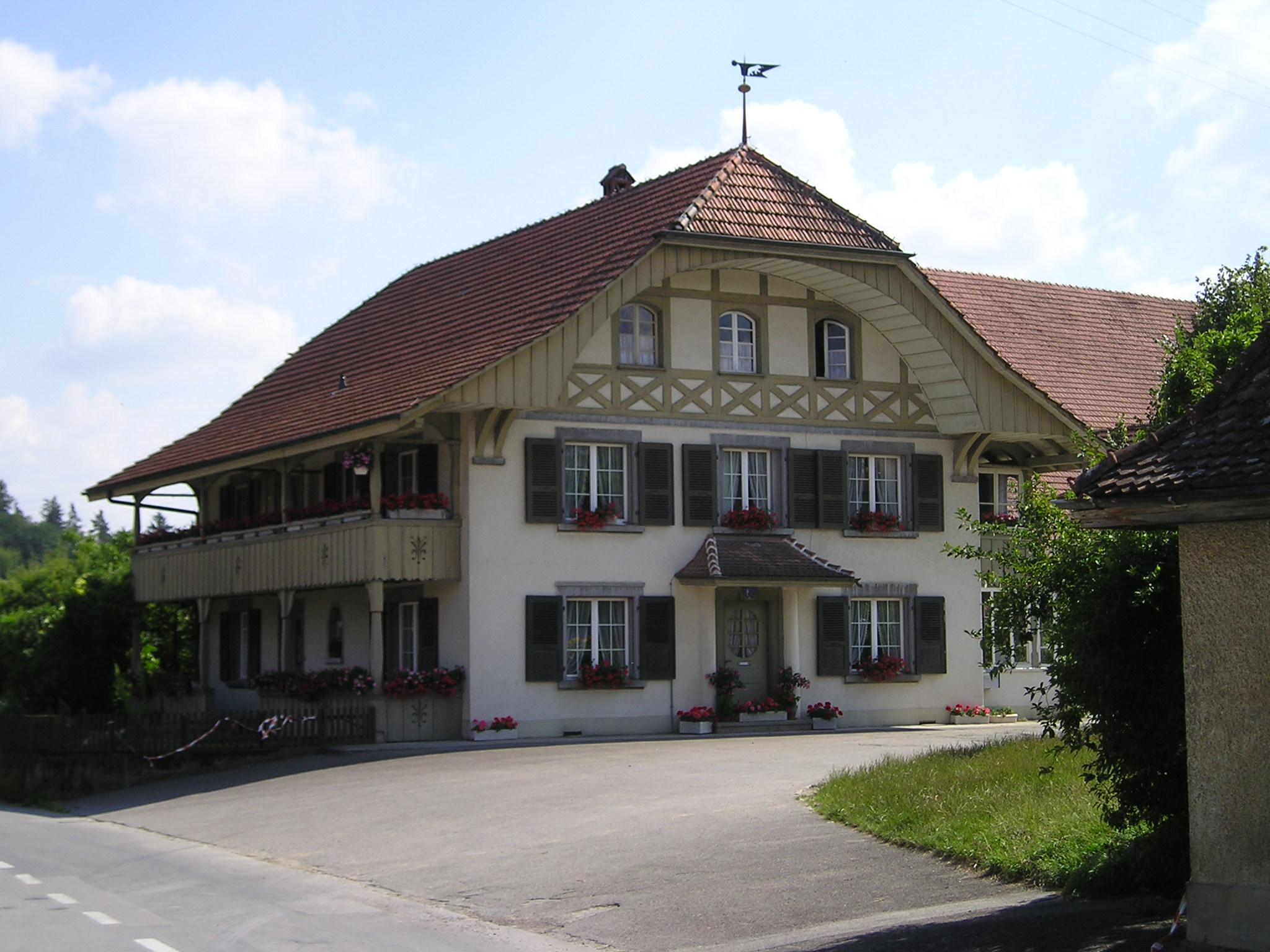
A farmhouse in the municipality

Wileroltigen has a population (as of December 2020) of 361. As of 2010, 10.4% of the population are resident foreign nationals. Over the last 10 years (2001-2011) the population has changed at a rate of -0.5%. Migration accounted for -0.5%, while births and deaths accounted for 0%.

Most of the population (as of 2000) speaks German (341 or 95.0%) as their first language, Albanian is the second most common (10 or 2.8%) and Portuguese is the third (2 or 0.6%). There is 1 person who speaks French and 1 person who speaks Italian.

As of 2008, the population was 48.9% male and 51.1% female. The population was made up of 171 Swiss men (43.5% of the population) and 21 (5.3%) non-Swiss men. There were 181 Swiss women (46.1%) and 20 (5.1%) non-Swiss women. Of the population in the municipality, 134 or about 37.3% were born in Wileroltigen and lived there in 2000. There were 140 or 39.0% who were born in the same canton, while 59 or 16.4% were born somewhere else in Switzerland, and 21 or 5.8% were born outside of Switzerland.

As of 2011, children and teenagers (0–19 years old) make up 27.6% of the population, while adults (20–64 years old) make up 61.6% and seniors (over 64 years old) make up 10.7%.

As of 2000, 159 people were single and never married in the municipality. There were 173 married individuals, 15 widows or widowers and 12 individuals who are divorced.

As of 2010, 30 households consist of only one person and 10 households with five or more people. In 2000, a total of 119 apartments (90.2% of the total) were permanently occupied, while 12 apartments (9.1%) were seasonally occupied and one apartment was empty. The vacancy rate for the municipality, in 2012, was 0.59%.

The historical population is given in the following chart:

== Sights ==
The entire village of Wileroltigen is designated as part of the Inventory of Swiss Heritage Sites.

== Politics ==
In the 2011 federal election the most popular party was the Swiss People's Party (SVP) which received 42.7% of the vote. The next three most popular parties were the Conservative Democratic Party (BDP) (21.4%), the Social Democratic Party (SP) (12.2%) and the Green Party (6.8%). In the federal election, a total of 131 votes were cast, and the voter turnout was 48.3%.

== Economy ==
As of 2011, Wileroltigen had an unemployment rate of 2.1%. As of 2008, there were a total of 98 people employed in the municipality. Of these, there were 65 people employed in the primary economic sector and about 19 businesses involved in this sector. 5 people were employed in the secondary sector and there was 1 business in this sector. 28 people were employed in the tertiary sector, with 7 businesses in this sector. There were 174 residents of the municipality who were employed in some capacity, of which females made up 40.2% of the workforce.

In 2008 there were a total of 64 full-time equivalent jobs. The number of jobs in the primary sector was 40, all of which were in agriculture. The number of jobs in the secondary sector was 4, all of which were in construction. The number of jobs in the tertiary sector was 20. In the tertiary sector; 1 was in wholesale or retail sales or the repair of motor vehicles, 4 or 20.0% were in a hotel or restaurant, 3 or 15.0% were in education and 5 or 25.0% were in health care.

In 2000, there were 15 workers who commuted into the municipality and 110 workers who commuted away. The municipality is a net exporter of workers, with about 7.3 workers leaving the municipality for every one entering. A total of 64 workers (81.0% of the 79 total workers in the municipality) both lived and worked in Wileroltigen. Of the working population, 13.2% used public transportation to get to work, and 50.6% used a private car.

In 2011 the average local and cantonal tax rate on a married resident of Wileroltigen making 150,000 CHF was 12.9%, while an unmarried resident's rate was 19%. For comparison, the average rate for the entire canton in 2006 was 13.9% and the nationwide rate was 11.6%. In 2009 there were a total of 156 tax payers in the municipality. Of that total, 60 made over 75,000 CHF per year. The average income of the over 75,000 CHF group in Wileroltigen was 99,230 CHF, while the average across all of Switzerland was 130,478 CHF.

== Religion ==
From the 2000 census, 293 or 81.6% belonged to the Swiss Reformed Church, while 36 or 10.0% were Roman Catholic. Of the rest of the population, there were 20 individuals (or about 5.57% of the population) who belonged to another Christian church. There were 4 (or about 1.11% of the population) who were Islamic. 12 (or about 3.34% of the population) belonged to no church, are agnostic or atheist, and 4 individuals (or about 1.11% of the population) did not answer the question.

== Education ==
In Wileroltigen about 63% of the population have completed non-mandatory upper secondary education, and 16.2% have completed additional higher education (either university or a Fachhochschule). Of the 29 who had completed some form of tertiary schooling listed in the census, 65.5% were Swiss men, 27.6% were Swiss women.

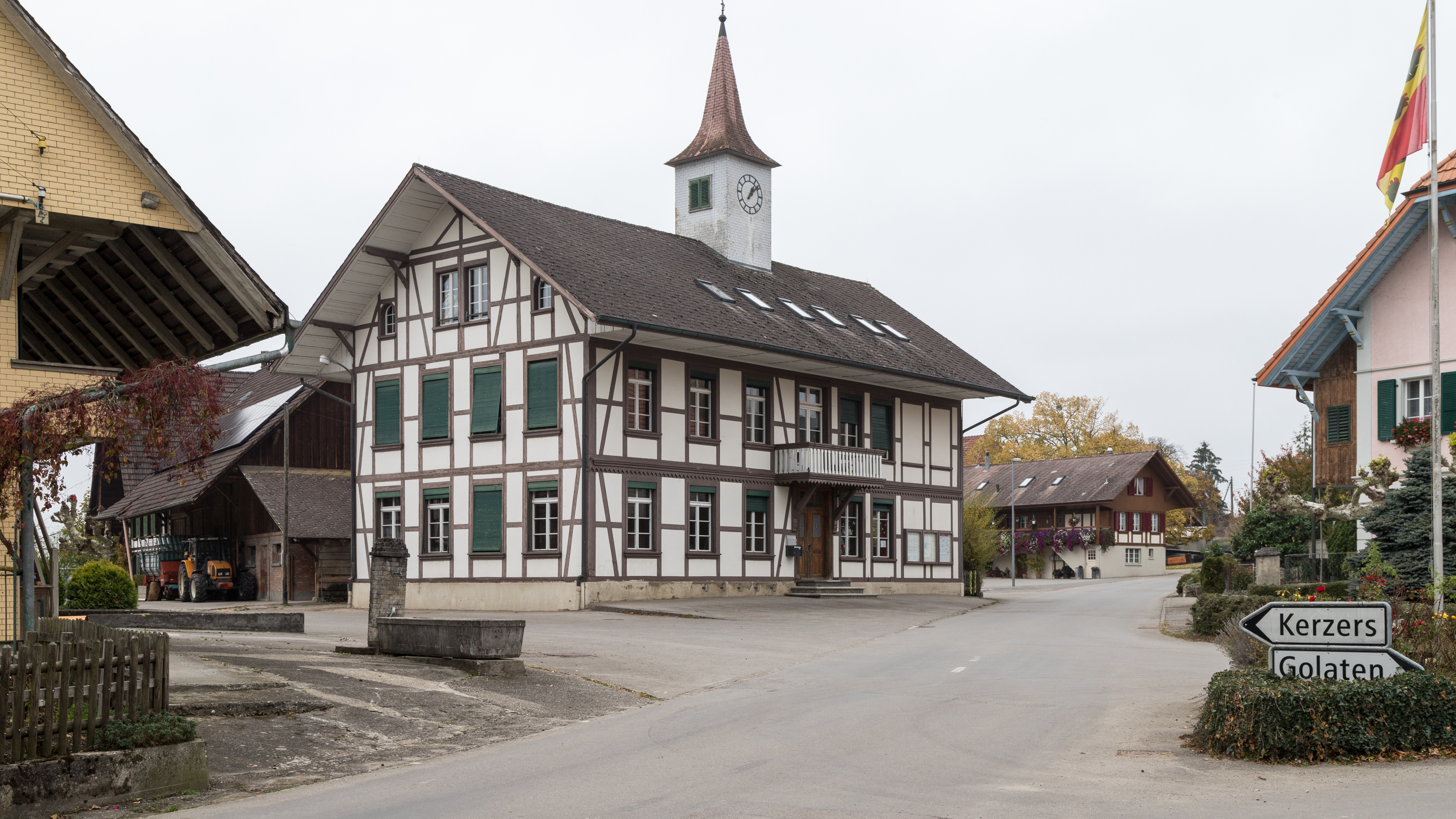
School in Wileroltigen

The Canton of Bern school system provides one year of non-obligatory Kindergarten, followed by six years of Primary school. This is followed by three years of obligatory lower Secondary school where the students are separated according to ability and aptitude. Following the lower Secondary students may attend additional schooling or they may enter an apprenticeship.

During the 2011-12 school year, there were a total of 52 students attending classes in Wileroltigen. There was one kindergarten class with a total of 16 students in the municipality. Of the kindergarten students, 12.5% were permanent or temporary residents of Switzerland (not citizens) and 6.3% have a different mother language than the classroom language. The municipality had 2 primary classes and 36 students. Of the primary students, 8.3% were permanent or temporary residents of Switzerland (not citizens) and 5.6% have a different mother language than the classroom language.

As of 2000, there were a total of 49 students attending any school in the municipality. Of those, 46 both lived and attended school in the municipality, while 3 students came from another municipality. During the same year, 27 residents attended schools outside the municipality.

== Transportation ==
The municipality has run a bus since December 2003, but it runs only on Monday through Friday. There is a primary school and a kindergarten in the municipality.
