= Gurbrü =

- Municipality
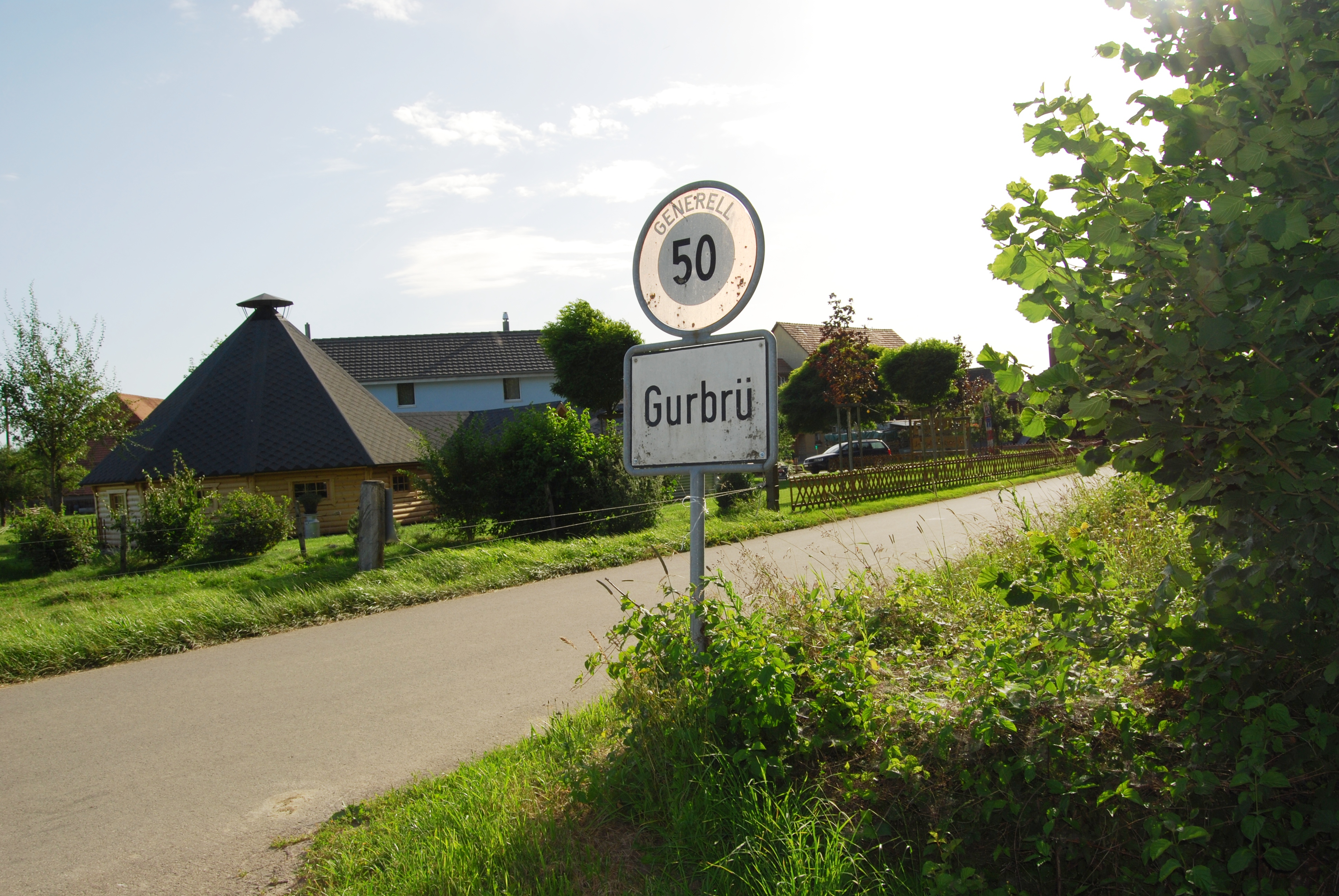

- Flag Coat of arms
- Location of Gurbrü
- Location within Switzerland Location within Canton of Bern
- Coordinates: 46°57′N 7°12′E
- Country: Switzerland
- Canton: Bern
- District: Bern-Mittelland

Government
  - Executive: Gemeinderat with 5 members
  - Mayor: Gemeindepräsident; Jürg Liechti (as of 2026)

Area
  - Total: 1.8 km^{2} (0.69 sq mi)
- Elevation: 484 m (1,588 ft)

Population (December 2020)
  - Total: 254
  - Density: 140/km^{2} (370/sq mi)
- Time zone: UTC+01:00 (CET)
  - Summer (DST): UTC+02:00 (CEST)
- Postal code: 3208
- SFOS number: 665
- ISO 3166 code: CH-BE
- Surrounded by: Wileroltigen, Ferenbalm, Agriswil, Ried bei Kerzers, Kerzers
- Website: https://gurbrue.ch/

Gurbrü (French: Corbruil) is a municipality in the Bern-Mittelland administrative district in the canton of Bern in Switzerland.

== History ==
Gurbrü is first mentioned in 1214 as Gurbru.

During the Middle Ages Gurbrü village was part of the Herrschaft of Oltigen. In 1410/12, the city of Bern absorbed the entire Herrschaft, including Gurbrü. The village was always part of the parish of Kerzers. During the Protestant Reformation, in 1528, both municipalities converted to the new faith and Gurbrü remained part of the Kerzers parish. In 1793, it fought with the neighboring communities, in the Canton of Fribourg, over the Gurbrümoos moor. The Gurbrümoos is now part of the Bernese municipality of Kallnach. After the 1798 French invasion, Golaten remained part of the Canton of Bern, despite attempts by the Canton of Fribourg to annex it. In 1901, the Bern–Neuchâtel railway built a station in the municipality.

== Geography ==
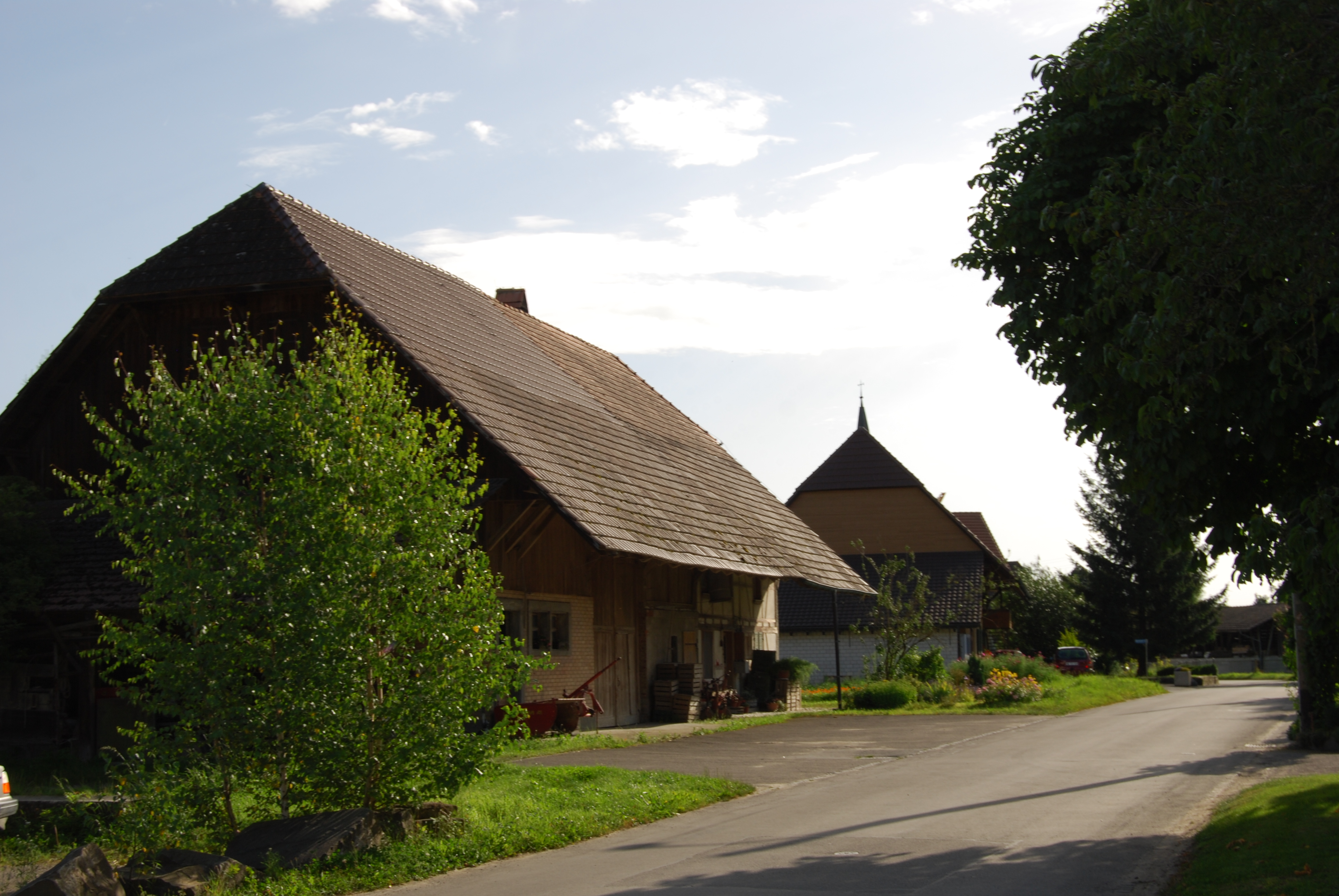
Farmhouses and fields in Gurbrü

Gurbrü has an area of 1.86 km^{2} (0.72 sq mi). As of 2012, a total of 1.3 km^{2} (0.50 mi^{2}) or 70.7% is used for agricultural purposes, while 0.18 km^{2} (0.069 mi^{2}) or 9.8% is forested. Of the rest of the land, 0.35 km^{2} (0.14 mi^{2}) or 19.0% is settled (buildings or roads).

During the same year, housing and buildings made up 7.1% and transportation infrastructure made up 11.4%. Out of the forested land, 8.2% of the total land area is heavily forested and 1.6% is covered with orchards or small clusters of trees. Of the agricultural land, 54.3% is used for growing crops and 13.6% is pastures, while 2.7% is used for orchards or vine crops.

Gurbrü lies in the Swiss Plateau on the edge of the Grosses Moos. It includes the village of Gurbrü and the hamlet of Stämpflerei. Stämpflerei, until 1854, belonged to Ried bei Kerzers in the Canton of Fribourg.

Gurbrü lies on the A13; however there is not an on-ramp in the municipality. The Kerzers–Gümmenen railroad runs through Gurbrü; however, the nearest station is in Ferenbalm. From Ferenbalm it is possible, via Bern Flamatt or Bern Bümplitz, to get to Bern. Normally travellers are recommended to use the good railway connections in four directions from Kerzers.

From 1963 to 1981 there was a land improvement program to enlarge the land parcels used in agriculture.

On 31 December 2009 Amtsbezirk Laupen, the municipality's former district, was dissolved. On the following day, 1 January 2010, it joined the newly created Verwaltungskreis Bern-Mittelland.

== Coat of arms ==
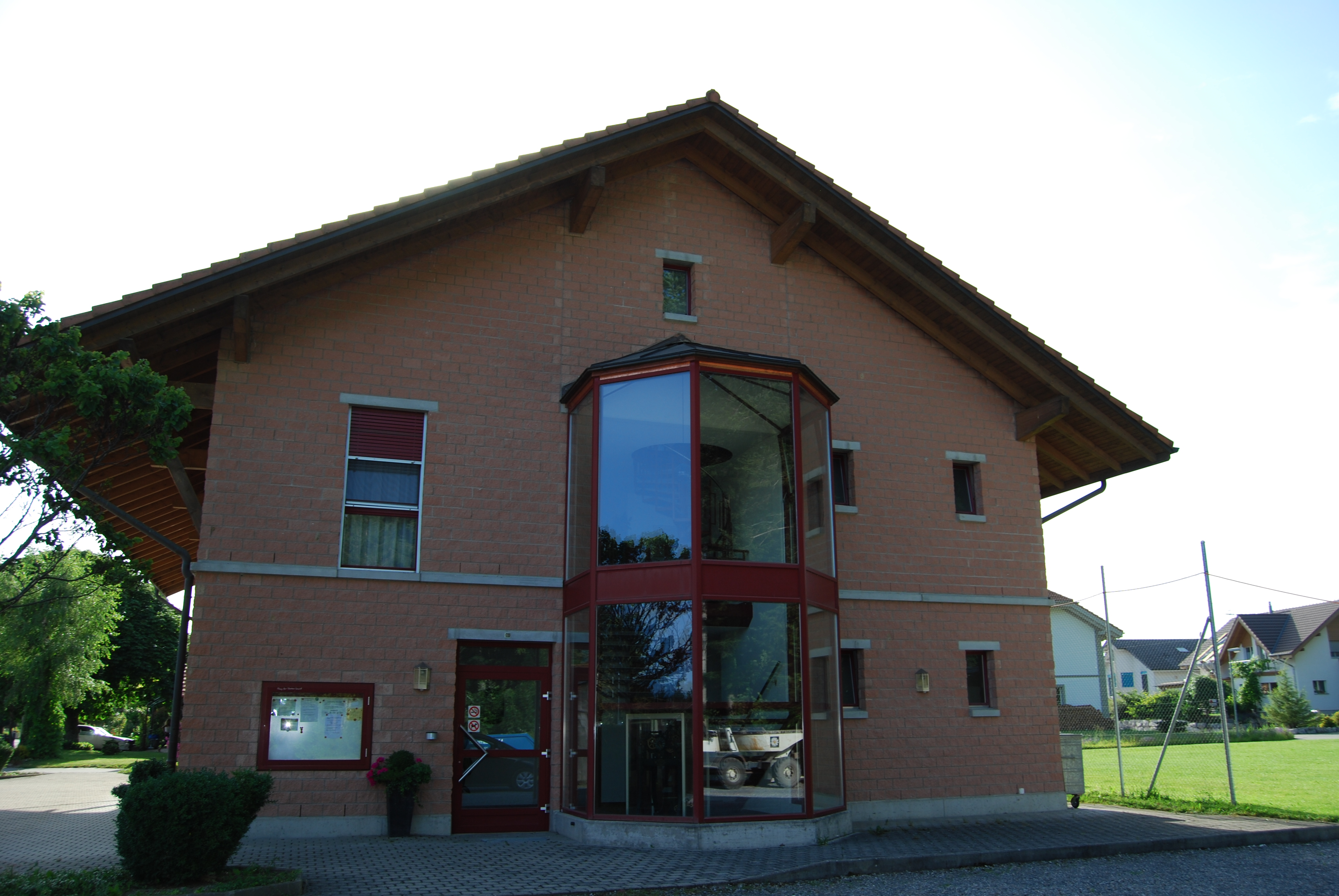
Municipal administration building

The blazon of the municipal coat of arms is Azure a Ploughshare Argent and Mount of 3 Coupeaux Vert.

== Demographics ==
Gurbrü has a population (as of December 2020) of 254. As of 2010, 11.2% of the population are resident foreign nationals. Over the last 10 years (2001-2011) the population has changed at a rate of -2.4%. Migration accounted for -1.6%, while births and deaths accounted for 0.4%.

Most of the population (as of 2000) speaks German (231 or 97.1%) as their first language, French is the second most common (5 or 2.1%) and Portuguese is the third (2 or 0.8%).

As of 2008, the population was 54.4% male and 45.6% female. The population was made up of 119 Swiss men (47.6% of the population) and 17 (6.8%) non-Swiss men. There were 103 Swiss women (41.2%) and 11 (4.4%) non-Swiss women. Of the population in the municipality, 92 or about 38.7% were born in Gurbrü and lived there in 2000. There were 79 or 33.2% who were born in the same canton, while 58 or 24.4% were born somewhere else in Switzerland, and 6 or 2.5% were born outside of Switzerland.

As of 2011, children and teenagers (0–19 years old) make up 23.4% of the population, while adults (20–64 years old) make up 53.7% and seniors (over 64 years old) make up 23%.

As of 2000, there were 95 people who were single and never married in the municipality. There were 122 married individuals, 16 widows or widowers and 5 individuals who are divorced.

As of 2010, there were 22 households that consist of only one person and 11 households with five or more people. In 2000, a total of 90 apartments (86.5% of the total) were permanently occupied, while 6 apartments (5.8%) were seasonally occupied and 8 apartments (7.7%) were empty.

The historical population is given in the following chart:

== Politics ==
In the 2011 federal election the most popular party was the Swiss People's Party (SVP) which received 52.6% of the vote. The next three most popular parties were the Conservative Democratic Party (BDP) (13.7%), the Social Democratic Party (SP) (8.1%) and the FDP.The Liberals (6.1%). In the federal election, a total of 112 votes were cast, and the voter turnout was 59.6%.

== Economy ==
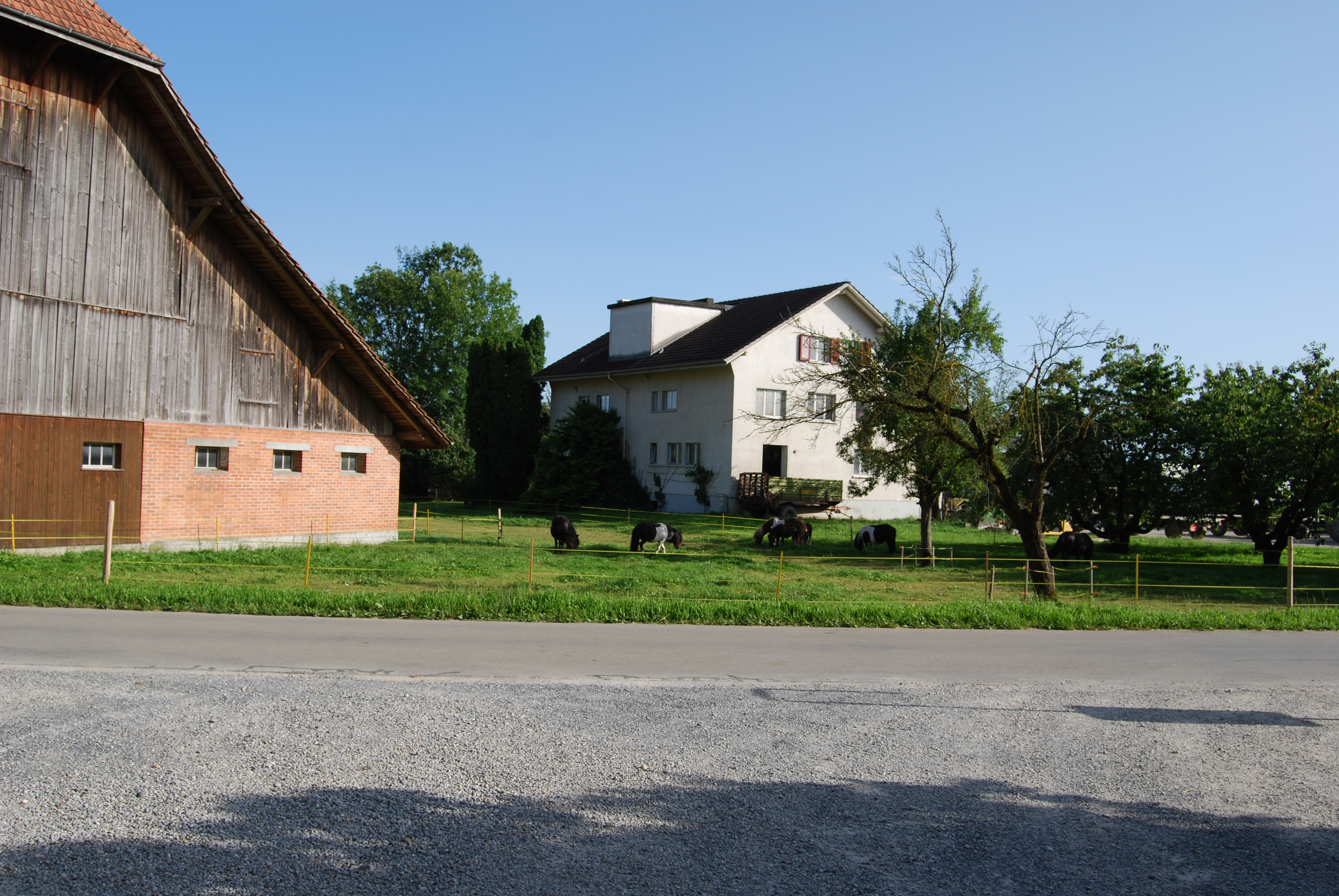
Cattle grazing in a small field in Gurbrü.

As of 2011, Gurbrü had an unemployment rate of 0.69%. As of 2008, there were a total of 125 people employed in the municipality. Of these, there were 112 people employed in the primary economic sector and about 15 businesses involved in this sector. 2 people were employed in the secondary sector and there was 1 business in this sector. 11 people were employed in the tertiary sector, with 6 businesses in this sector. There were 143 residents of the municipality who were employed in some capacity, of which females made up 44.8% of the workforce.

In 2008 there were a total of 69 full-time equivalent jobs. The number of jobs in the primary sector was 59, all of which were in agriculture. The number of jobs in the secondary sector was 2, all of which were in manufacturing. The number of jobs in the tertiary sector was 8. In the tertiary sector; 5 or 62.5% were in wholesale or retail sales or the repair of motor vehicles, 1 was a technical professional or scientist, 1 was in education.

In 2000, there were 12 workers who commuted into the municipality and 95 workers who commuted away. The municipality is a net exporter of workers, with about 7.9 workers leaving the municipality for every one entering. A total of 48 workers (80.0% of the 60 total workers in the municipality) both lived and worked in Gurbrü. Of the working population, 18.9% used public transportation to get to work, and 44.8% used a private car.

In 2011 the average local and cantonal tax rate on a married resident of Gurbrü making 150,000 CHF was 13.1%, while an unmarried resident's rate was 19.2%. For comparison, the average rate for the entire canton in 2006 was 13.9% and the nationwide rate was 11.6%. In 2009 there were a total of 98 tax payers in the municipality. Of that total, 28 made over 75,000 CHF per year. There was one person who made between 15,000 and 20,000 per year. The greatest number of workers, 38, made between 50 and 75 thousand CHF per year. The average income of the over 75,000 CHF group in Gurbrü was 117,961 CHF, while the average across all of Switzerland was 130,478 CHF.

== Religion ==
From the 2000 census, 195 or 81.9% belonged to the Swiss Reformed Church, while 17 or 7.1% were Roman Catholic. Of the rest of the population, there were 3 individuals (or about 1.26% of the population) who belonged to another Christian church. 21 (or about 8.82% of the population) belonged to no church, are agnostic or atheist, and 2 individuals (or about 0.84% of the population) did not answer the question.

== Education ==
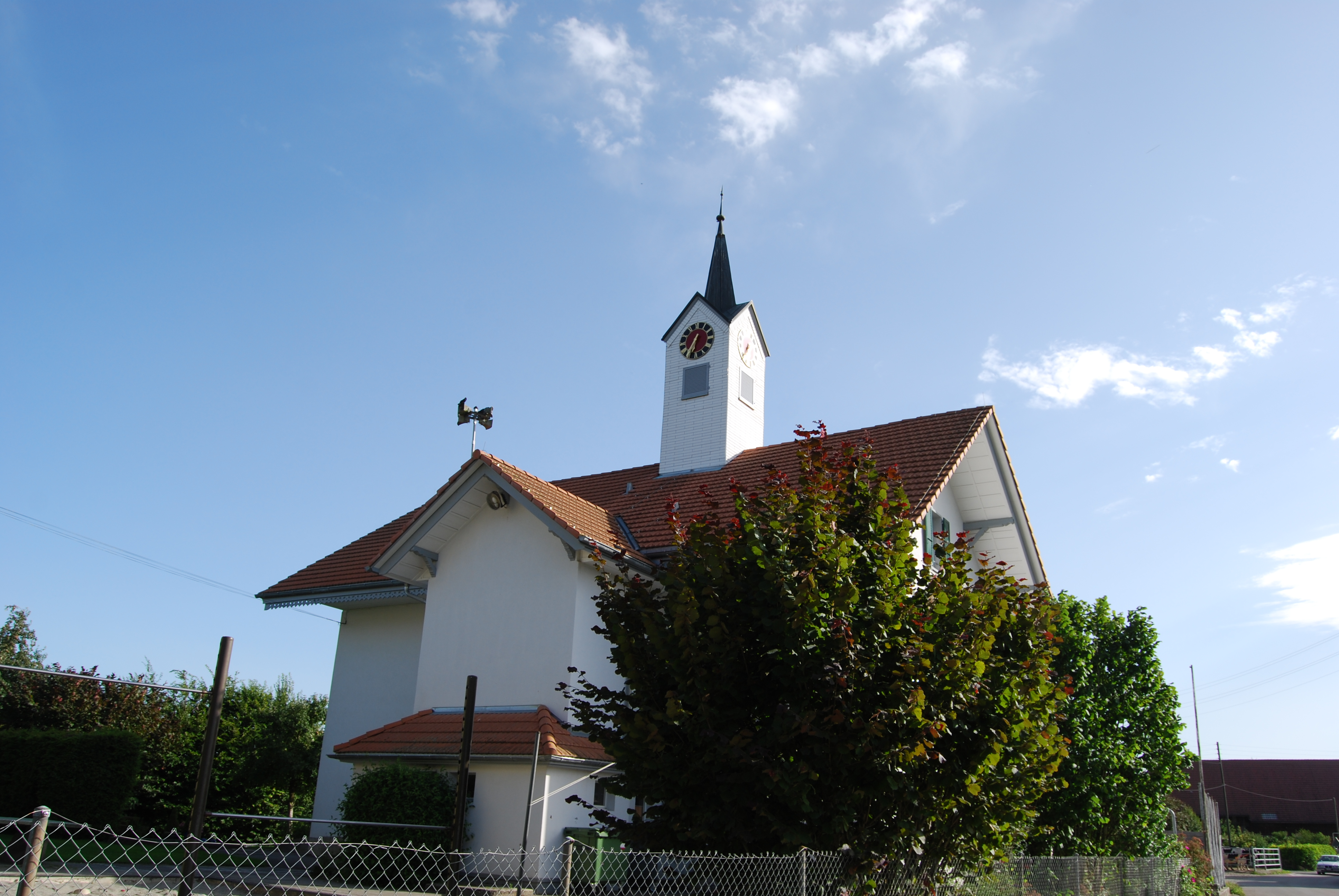
Gurbrü municipal school house

In Gurbrü about 59.7% of the population have completed non-mandatory upper secondary education, and 18.7% have completed additional higher education (either university or a Fachhochschule). Of the 27 who had completed some form of tertiary schooling listed in the census, 66.7% were Swiss men, 33.3% were Swiss women.

The Canton of Bern school system provides one year of non-obligatory Kindergarten, followed by six years of Primary school. This is followed by three years of obligatory lower Secondary school where the students are separated according to ability and aptitude. Following the lower Secondary students may attend additional schooling or they may enter an apprenticeship.

During the 2011–12 school year, there were a total of 24 students attending classes in Gurbrü. There were no kindergarten classes in the municipality. The municipality had 2 primary classes and 24 students. Of the primary students, 12.5% were permanent or temporary residents of Switzerland (not citizens) and 8.3% have a different mother language than the classroom language.

As of 2000, there were a total of 17 students attending any school in the municipality. Of those, 16 both lived and attended school in the municipality, while one student came from another municipality. During the same year, 17 residents attended schools outside the municipality.

In Gurbrü about 59.7% of the population have completed non-mandatory upper secondary education, and 18.7% have completed additional higher education (either university or a Fachhochschule). Of the 27 who had completed some form of tertiary schooling listed in the census, 66.7% were Swiss men, 33.3% were Swiss women. The Canton of Bern school system provides one year of non-obligatory Kindergarten, followed by six years of Primary school. This is followed by three years of obligatory lower Secondary school where the students are separated according to ability and aptitude. Following the lower Secondary students may attend additional schooling or they may enter an apprenticeship. During the 2011–12 school year, there were a total of 24 students attending classes in Gurbrü. There were no kindergarten classes in the municipality. The municipality had 2 primary classes and 24 students. Of the primary students, 12.5% were permanent or temporary residents of Switzerland (not citizens) and 8.3% have a different mother language than the classroom language. As of 2000, there were a total of 17 students attending any school in the municipality. Of those, 16 both lived and attended school in the municipality, while one student came from another municipality. During the same year, 17 residents attended schools outside the municipality.
