= Siarhei Ramanau =

Siarhei Aliaksandravich Ramanau (Belarusian: Сяргей Аляксандравіч Раманаў) is a Belarusian Anarchist political prisoner. In total, he has been sentenced to 24 years and 5 months in prison.

The Viasna Human Rights Centre, the Belarusian Helsinki Committee, the Belarusian PEN Center, the Belarusian Association of Journalists and several other human rights organizations declared him to be a political prisoner.

== Life ==
Sergey Ramanau became interested in anarchist ideas during his adolescence. He is interested in hiking, extreme forms of travel, painting and tattooing.

Ramanau was arrested in 2014 and sentenced under Article 295-3 of the Criminal Code of the Republic of Belarus to five years' imprisonment. He was released in 2019.

=== The Anarcho-Partisan Case ===
During the 2020–2021 protests in Belarus following the presidential election, Belarusian border guards arrested Sergey Ramanau and three other anarchists — Ihar Alinevich, Dzmitry Dubouski and Dzmitry Rezanovich — during the night of 28–29 October 2020 in the Yel'sk District, near the Belarusian-Ukrainian border.

They were charged under Article 289 of the Criminal Code (“Terrorism”), as well as Article 295 (“Illegal trafficking in weapons”). The anarchists were accused of setting fire to four vehicles near the prosecutor's office in Salihorsk and the local branch of the State Committee for Forensic Examinations.

He was initially sentenced to 20 years' imprisonment. In court, he stated: "There is no point in living according to the conditions imposed by your enemies and trying to win a game in which they set the rules. Direct struggle and breaking out of the imposed constraints will restore to the people the rights that have been stolen from them. In the name of victory over slavery, it is worth fighting the entire system to the very last minute, without doubting for a moment the righteousness of our cause or the justice of the struggle against tyranny. And in this struggle, time is on our side, and the triumph of freedom is inevitable, despite the hardships and suffering endured by the people". On 29 October 2021, Sergey Ramanau was sentenced in Homyel to an additional year in prison for “violating the conditions of supervision” imposed following his previous conviction.

In March 2023 and September 2024, he was sentenced twice more under the article concerning “malicious disobedience to the requirements of the prison administration.” As a result, his total prison sentence amounted to 22 years and 11 months.

In autumn 2025, information emerged that Sergey Ramanau had been hospitalized and had undergone a scheduled operation, which was completed without complications. According to the available information, after treatment he was due to be returned to a correctional colony.
