= Dmitry Petrov (anarchist) =

Russian historian and anarchist (1989–2023)

- Дмитрий Петров

Personal details
- Born: 9 September 1989 Soviet Union
- Died: 19 April 2023 (aged 33) Bakhmut, Ukraine
- Cause of death: Killed in action
- Party: Combat Organization of Anarcho-Communists
- Other political affiliations: Russian opposition
- Education: Moscow State University
- Occupation: Ethnographer
- Website: leshy.info/en/ paganantifa.ucoz.ru
- Nickname(s): Ilya Leshiy, Phil Kuznetsov, Ecolog, Dmitry Chashchin

Military service
- Allegiance: Ukraine
- Branch/service: Armed Forces of Ukraine; Main Directorate of Intelligence (GUR)
- Years of service: 2022–2023
- Unit: 95th Air Assault Brigade; Bratstvo Battalion
- Battles/wars: Russo-Ukrainian War; Russian invasion of Ukraine; Battle of Kyiv; Battle of Kreminna; Battle of Bakhmut †

Dmitry Dmitrievich Petrov (Russian: Дмитрий Дмитриевич Петров; 9 September 1989 – 19 April 2023), also known by his nom de guerre Ilya Leshiy (Ukrainian: Ілля Лєший) and under other pseudonyms, was a Russian anarchist activist, ethnographer and historian. Following the Russian invasion of Ukraine, he volunteered for the Armed Forces of Ukraine and was killed in the battle of Bakhmut.

== Biography ==
=== Activism in Russia ===
Dmitry Petrov joined the Russian anarchist movement in 2004, when he was still a teenager. In the 2000s, he was known among Russian anarchists by the pseudonym "Ecologist" for his environmental activism. He was involved in organizing protests against the construction of waste incineration plants as well as participating in the defense of the Bitsevsky Park and the Khimki Forest. In addition to environmental protection activities, he also participated in street fights against Russian neo-Nazis, the activities of the anarchist trade union Interprofessional Union of Workers, social protests against the eviction of dormitory residents, independent book publishing and cultural and educational events.

He was expelled from KRAS-AIT in September 2008 after a referendum of the Moscow organization. He subsequently became a founding member of Interprofessional Union of Workers (MPST).

From 2009, he was a participant in the guerrilla struggle against the Russian regime, co-founding the Black Blog, whose team participated in and covered radical anarchist actions, such as the arson of construction equipment in places of illegal construction, police cars and stations, military registration and enlistment offices, and United Russia offices. Petrov himself was directly involved in the arson of the State Tax Service.

He took part in the Snow Revolution in Russia (2011–2013), the Revolution of Dignity in Ukraine (2013–2014) and the Slipper Revolution in Belarus (2020). To take part in the Belarusian protests, he illegally crossed the Ukrainian-Belarusian border since he faced extradition to Russia in Belarus.

=== Activism and academic work in Kurdistan ===
In the years after the Euromaidan, he defended his PhD thesis on the "Sacred Geography of the Eastern Districts of the Arkhangelsk Region" and worked as a researcher at the Centre for Civilisational and Regional Studies of the Institute of Africa of the Russian Academy of Sciences. Inspired by David Graeber's article on the social revolution in Rojava, in 2017 he spent six months in Syrian Kurdistan, where he studied the Kurmanji language, local experience of self-organisation and social transformation, and supported the Kurds' fight against the Islamic State. He was engaged in promoting information about Kurdistan and the Middle East in general as part of the research project Hevale: Revolution in Kurdistan, co-authored and co-edited the books Life without a State: The Revolution in Kurdistan and Desert Flowers: 10 Years of the Rojava Revolution, as well as a translator of the study Kurdistan. Real Democracy under War and Blockade. His materials about Kurdistan also appeared in the Ukrainian publications Commons and Political Critique.

During his stay in Kurdistan, he found out that the FSB was interested in him and, against the backdrop of persecution of anarchist and anti-fascist activists by the Putin regime, he decided not to return to Russia and moved to Kyiv in 2018.

=== Combat in the Russian invasion of Ukraine ===
After the start of the Russian invasion of Ukraine in 2022, he claimed to be involved in the creation of an "anti-authoritarian platoon" in the Territorial Defense Forces of the Kyiv region, an initiative that became known as the Resistance Committee. Later he was transferred to the 95th Air Assault Brigade, within which he fought in the Battle of the Svatove–Kreminna line in the autumn and winter. In the spring of 2023, he moved to another unit and was transferred to fight in the Battle of Bakhmut.

He was a co-founder of the Combat Organization of Anarcho-Communists (BOAK). In his farewell letter to the BOAK in case of his death at the front, he wrote that he would remain a member of the organisation after his death.

He was killed in the battle of Bakhmut along with Irish socialist Finbar Cafferkey and African-American activist Cooper "Harris" Andrews while fighting with the Bratstvo Battalion. According to their associates, the group of left-wing volunteers had temporarily joined the unit (which is linked to a far-right Christian movement) in order to receive military training and reach the front, with the intention of later forming their own leftist formation.

== Personal life ==
Petrov was a practitioner of the Slavic Native Faith, belonging to the pagan-antifa movement.

== Legacy ==
=== Anarchist circles ===
His memory was celebrated shortly after his death, at Anarchy 2023, possibly the largest anarchist gathering of the 21st century, where a commemoration was led by Ukrainian and Belarusian anarchists.

== Works ==
Thesis

- Petrov, Dmitry (2015). Сакральная география восточных районов Архангельской области [Sacred geography of the eastern regions of the Arkhangelsk region] (Thesis) (in Russian). Moscow State University.

Articles

- Petrov, Dmitry (21 July 2016). "Государство вместо того, чтобы защищать граждан и блюсти закон, занимается ровно противоположным" [Instead of protecting citizens and upholding the law, the state is doing the exact opposite]. OpenDemocracy (in Russian).
- Petrov, Dmitry (16 June 2017). "Between two Kurdistans: a Russian anthropologist's journey in search of self-government". OpenDemocracy.
- Petrov, Dmitry (10 October 2019). "Нападение Эрдогана на Рожаву. Не конец, а продолжение". Political Critique (in Russian).
- Petrov, Dmitry (21 October 2019). "Конфедерация или Империя: ключевой вопрос войны в Сирийском Курдистане". Commons (in Russian).
- Petrov, Dmitry (10 August 2020). "Автономия против коронавируса. Как Рожава борется с эпидемией". Commons (in Russian).
- Petrov, Dmitry (19 August 2020). "Автономия против коронавируса. Как Рожава борется с эпидемией" [Autonomy Against Coronavirus: How Rojava is Fighting the Epidemic]. Nihilist.li. Hevale: Revolution in Kurdistan (in Russian).
- Petrov, Dmitry (27 April 2023). "Last Letter". Organise! – via The Anarchist Library.

Books

- Okrest, D.; Petrov, Dmitry; Lebsky, M., eds. (2017). Жизнь без государства: революция в Курдистане [Life Without a State: Revolution in Kurdistan] (in Russian). Moscow: Common Place.
- Petrov, Dmitry; Okrest, D.; Sidorov, D., eds. (2022). Цветы пустыни: 10 лет революции в Рожаве [Flowers of the Desert: 10 Years of Revolution in Rojava] (in Russian). Moscow: Napilnik.

Lectures

- Petrov, Dmitry (7 March 2017). Tales of Kurdistan. Political Critique (in Russian).

Pseudonymous articles

- Kuznetsov, Phil (7 November 2018). "Anarchist with a gun". Combat Organization of Anarcho-Communists – via The Anarchist Library.
- Kuznetsov, Phil (28 April 2021). "The Anarchist Mission In The Modern World". Combat Organization of Anarcho-Communists – via The Anarchist Library.
- Kuznetsov, Phil (12 July 2021). "Don't give up, don't give out". Combat Organization of Anarcho-Communists – via The Anarchist Library.
- Kuznetsov, Phil (2022). "To be a revolutionary". Combat Organization of Anarcho-Communists – via The Anarchist Library.
- Leshiy, Ilya (11 September 2022). "Four Months in an Anti-Authoritarian Platoon in Ukraine". Libcom.org.

== See also ==
- Lana Chornohorska
