= Mikola Dziadok =

Belarusian journalist

- Мікалай Аляксандравіч Дзядок
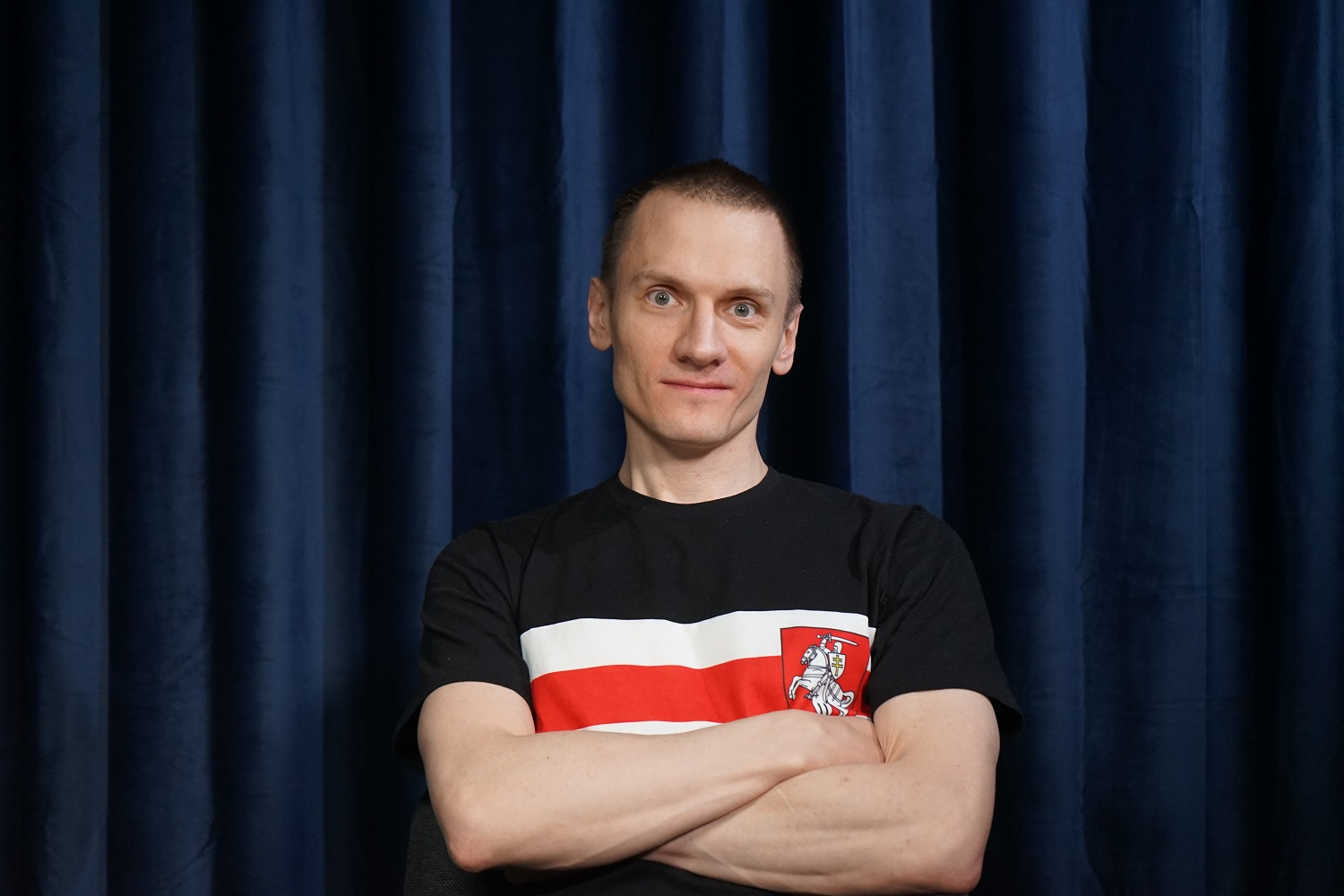
- Born: August 23, 1988 (age 37); Brahin, Gomel Region, Byelorussia
- Citizenship: Belarus
- Education: BSU, EHU
- Occupation: Journalist
- Years active: 2010–present
- Employer: Novy Chas
- Movement: Anarchism
- Awards: Ales Korol Award; Francisk Alekhnovicha Award
- Website: mikola.noblogs.org

Mikola Aliaksandravich Dziadok (Belarusian: Мікалай Аляксандравіч Дзядок) is a Belarusian political activist, journalist, author, and former political prisoner. Following a political agreement involving John Coale diplomatic efforts in September 2025, he was released and currently lives in exile in Lithuania, where he continues his work as a political analyst and blogger.

== Biography ==
Mikola Dziadok was born on August 23, 1988, in Brahin, Belarus. He graduated from the BSU Law College. After graduating from college, he was enrolled in the 3rd year of the Faculty of Law of BSU, but didn't study there. He left BSU and entered the European Humanities University at the political science department, where he studied in absentia; at the time of his arrest, he was a 2nd year student. He worked in a collection firm, where he acted as a journalist, lawyer and programmer at the same time. He also became a member of the Belarusian anarchist movement. In May 2011, Dziadok was sentenced to 4.5 years in prison in a maximum security colony for participating in attacks on government buildings. Later, he graduated from the European Humanities University (EHU) in Lithuania with a BA in International Politics and Economics.

In February 2015, Dziadok was sentenced to an additional year in prison under Article 411 of the Criminal Code of the Republic of Belarus. After his release, he continued his social and political activities, took up journalism and research in the field of political science.

=== Arrest and prison sentence ===
Before his arrest, Dziadok was an activist unknown to the general public: his name appeared in the media for the first time only in connection with his arrest. Mikola Dziadok was detained on September 3, 2010, as a suspect in the case of the attack on the Russian Embassy in Minsk on the night of August 31. The law enforcement bodies of Belarus arrested the young man for three days and placed him in a temporary detention center. Failing to collect a sufficient amount of evidence that would confirm Mikola's involvement in the case, law enforcement agencies extended the term of his detention, but in a different case – an attack on the House of Trade Unions. When the accusation of his participation again did not receive sufficient evidence, Mikola was detained for the third time as a suspect in the case of an attack on a Belarusbank branch. After that, when all possibilities for detention were exhausted, they began to ascribe other illegal actions to Mikola, in particular, theft and hooliganism. On September 24, 2010, having already served more than 20 days under arrest, Mikola Dziadok was accused of participating in an unauthorized rally near the General Staff of Belarus, and on October 1, 2010, he was charged under Article 339, part 2, for hooliganism. On May 27, 2011, the Zavodskoy Court of Minsk sentenced Dziadok to 4 1/2 years in a high security prison. Mikola was held in the so-called "anarchist case" together with Igor Olinevich (sentenced to 8 years) and Alexander Frantskevich (sentenced to 3 years).

At the trial, Dziadok did not admit his guilt. Later in prison, he refused to sign a petition for pardon addressed to the president. While imprisoned, on September 13, 2011, Mikola Dziadok married Valeria Khotsina in the Mogilev colony. In October 2011, the Viasna Human Rights Centre and the Belarusian Helsinki Committee recognized those convicted in the "anarchist case", including Mikola Dziadok, as political prisoners. Dziadok was taken under the patronage of Sari Essayah, MEP from Finland, in November 2011. In prisons No. 15 and 17 of Shklov, Mikola received more than 10 penalties for various far-fetched violations. By a court decision on December 5, 2012, the conditions of serving the sentence were changed to stricter ones – he was transferred from prison No. 17 in Shklov to prison No. 4 in Mogilev.

In November 2014, a new criminal case was opened against Dziadok under Article 411 for "willful disobedience to the requirements of the administration of the correctional institution". Five days before the end of his term on February 26, 2015, the Leninsky District Court of Mogilev sentenced Mikola Dziadok to 1 year in a strict regime prison, under Article 411 of the Criminal Code of the Republic of Belarus for "malignant disobedience to the demands of the administration". Dziadok was charged with 16 violations of the regime in places of detention. For each of these 16 violations, Mikola had already been punished in a disciplinary order, having received a reprimand of from 5 to 10 days in a punishment cell.

After the conviction, he wrote an open letter to the press, in which he criticized Art. 411 of the Criminal Code as inhumane and repressive.

On May 12, 2015, Mikola was transferred to penal colony No 9 in Gorki, where out of the first 50 days of his stay, he spent 42 days in a punishment cell "for violation of the sentence serving regime" and "refusal to work". To draw attention to the unbearable conditions of detention, on May 20, 2015, Dziadok was forced to inflict cut wounds on his stomach and arms.

On June 24, 2015, Manuel Sarrazin, Member of the German Bundestag and representative of the Alliance 90/The Greens parliamentary group in the European Parliament, took over the "patronage" of the political prisoner Mikola Dziadok. On August 22, 2015, Alexander Lukashenko pardoned six political prisoners – Mikola Dziadok, Igor Olinevich, Nikolai Statkevich, Yevgeny Vaskovich, Artem Prokopenko and Yuri Rubtsov. The report notes that the decision to pardon was made in accordance with the "principle of humanism".

=== After release ===
After his release, Mikola Dziadok returned to the European Humanities University under the International Politics and Economics program, which he graduated from in 2019. He is a former member of the anarchist movement. He works as a journalist for the "Novy Chas" newspaper, writes for other publications, maintains a number of blogs on social networks and a channel in the Telegram messenger, as well as a Radix video blog on "revolutionary political analysis, social struggle and anarchism in Belarus." He has written several books. Since October 2019 to March, 2020, he has been a fellow of K. Kalinowski's master's degree program and a student of Polish language courses at the Center for Language and Polish Culture of the Maria Skłodowska-Curie University.

=== Continued persecution ===
On March 25, 2017, Mikola Dziadok was detained in Minsk and taken to the Partizanskiy ROVD, and then to the Center for Isolation of Offenders. On the same day, he was taken with a head injury to the emergency hospital, accompanied by police. After 4 days spent in the hospital, Dziadok was escorted to court, where he received 10 days of arrest under Articles 23.34 (Violation of the procedure for holding mass events) and Art. 23.4 Administrative Code (Disobedience to police orders).

==== 2018 ====
On June 30, 2018, along with 17 other anarchists, he was detained by a special forces group SOBR and employees of the GUBOPiK during the crackdown on an informal meeting of anarchists in a forest near Krupki. According to Mikola himself, he spent five hours in handcuffs with his face to the ground. Dziadok appealed to law enforcement agencies with a request to initiate a criminal case against employees of the GUBOPiK for abuse of office.

On July 12, 2018, Dziadok was detained near his house by riot policemen, when he was going to the trial of journalist Dmitry Galko. He was taken to the Frunzensky District Department of Internal Affairs, and then to the Frunzensky District Court, where he received a fine of 10 basic units under Art. 17.10 of the Administrative Code of the Republic of Belarus. "Demonstration of Nazi symbols". The reason for initiating an administrative case was a post on Facebook condemning Nazism.

On December 27, 2018, Dziadok was fined by the Frunzensky District Court of Minsk in the amount of 40 base units under Article 17.10 of the Administrative Code of the Republic of Belarus. He was accused of distributing extremist products: posting on his Facebook page an illustration depicting the symbols of the Misantropic Division (an international association of neo-Nazi groups), which was included in the republican list of extremist materials by the court of the Central District of Minsk.

But Dziadok's post was directed precisely against Nazism: “The picture from July 2016 is an illustration for a post in which I criticize people for standing next to the Nazis (!!!). Photos are driven to confirm their words. Do you understand the charm of the whole situation? Indeed, how can Nazism be condemned when any illustrative material can be retroactively outlawed? If we proceed from the GUBOPiK's information, then we should judge, for example, those who broadcast military newsreels on television, employees of the Belarusian television who show Nazis and do not retouch them,” he explained his position. The case was heard by judge Maria Erokhina.

==== 2019 ====
Mikola Dziadok became a defendant in a high-profile scandal involving the Russian media. The reason was seven articles in the Novy Chas newspaper, where Dziadok works, dedicated to Chechen political and military leaders, in particular, Shamil Basayev. In the 2017 article "Basayev: Your Great Russian dream – sitting up to your throat in shit to drag everyone else there ...", dedicated to the 11th anniversary of the murder of the field commander, Mikola Dziadok presented Basayev as an ambiguous personality, from which, however, "they make a monster from hell". In January 2019, two years later, the Russian media drew attention to it, criticizing and condemning the author of the article, Dziadok, as well as Alena Anisim, who is the head of the Belarusian Language Association and the founder of the newspaper "Novy Chas". From the point of view of a number of media outlets, the publication is a “glorification of terrorists".

The article on the Belarusian pro-Russian website Teleskop, which started the information attack, was rewritten and supplemented by dozens of Russian media outlets. A number of pro-Russian Belarusian media, as well as a member of the Bureau of Belarusian Left Party Sergei Voznyak and Liberal Democratic Party leader Oleg Gaidukevich, also joined in the persecution. In turn, a number of Belarusian mass media spoke out in defense of Dziadok and Anisim, in particular Belarusian Partisan and Nasha Niva.

The authors of the Teleskop website sent statements to the Ministry of Information and the Procurator, demanding that Novy Chas and Mikola Dziadok be brought to justice. Veteran of the Ministry of Internal Affairs of Russia Oleg Ivannikov appealed to the Procurator of the Chechen Republic and personally to Ramzan Kadyrov with a request "to initiate an inspection of the publication of the newspaper Novy Chas". However, none of these appeals had legal consequences for Mikola Dziadok or the newspaper Novy Chas.

On March 4, 2019, Dziadok was detained near the Frunzensky District Court of Minsk, immediately after he was fined under Art. 17.11 of the Administrative Code of the Republic of Belarus "Distribution of extremist materials" for a post on social networks. Mikola spent more than 2 days in a temporary detention center, after which the judge of the Central Court of Minsk Victoria Shabunya sentenced him to a fine of 25 basic units for participating in the action "Freedom for political prisoners".

On June 10, 2019, in the Frunzensky District Court, Judge M. Erokhin found Mikola Dziadok guilty of "public demonstration and distribution of extremist materials" and sentenced him to a fine of 50 basic units (1,275 rubles or 624 dollars). According to the court ruling, Nikolai posted on the Vkontakte social network a post with four extremist letters "ASAV". The blogger himself was not present at the trial and did not decide to appeal the decision to a higher court.

On September 16, 2019, the Frunzensky District Court again convicted Mikola Dziadok for using the abbreviation "ACAB" in the social network "Vkontakte", and imposed a fine on him in the amount of 40 basic units. The trial was conducted by judge E. V. Pisarevich. "You can endlessly look at three things: how the fire burns, how the water flows, how the GUBOPiK fights my social networks..." – the blogger commented on this judgment on his page.

==== 2020 ====
On January 9, 2020, the Frunzensky District Court convicted Mikola Dziadok under Article 23.34 for participating in an unauthorized action in defense of the independence of Belarus in Minsk on December 21, 2019. The fine was 50 basic units. The trial was conducted by judge A. V. Busheva.

On March 19, 2020, Mikola Dziadok was detained by police officers on charges of minor hooliganism (17.1. Administrative Code of the Republic of Belarus). The activist was taken to the Center for Isolation of Offenders and accused of putting an anti-police inscription on the wall of the dormitory. The next day, when the activist was taken to the Moskovsky district court of Minsk, it turned out that on the day of the inscription, Mikola Dziadok was outside Belarus, which is stamped in his passport. The case was sent to the Moscow District Department of Internal Affairs in Minsk for revision, and later terminated for lack of corpus delicti.

On November 11, 2020, he was detained by GUBOPiK officers in an apartment in the town of Sasnovy of the Asipovichy District. During the arrest, pepper gas was used, and Dziadok was severely beaten. The arrested in the framework of a criminal case on "violation of public order" (Art. 342 of the Criminal Code) was forced to appear on camera for the video of the Ministry of Internal Affairs. After the arrest, he was taken to Minsk to GUBOPiK, where was tortured: siloviki kept him pressed with his head to the floor, beat him with a truncheon, strangled, and threatened to rape all night long. Then he was taken to the detention center Okrestina, later was transferred to SIZO No. 1 in Minsk. In detention, the activist was deprived of sleep, heat, and contact with the outside world.

On November 24, by a joint statement of 11 organizations, including the Viasna Human Rights Centre, the Belarusian Helsinki Committee, he was recognized as a political prisoner. On January 15, 2021, godparenthood for the political prisoner was undertaken by Tamara Funiciello, member of the Federal Assembly (Switzerland).

In March 2021, the Investigative Committee of Belarus opened new criminal cases against the political prisoner on calling for the seizure of power (part 3 of article 361 of the Criminal Code) and illegal actions in relation to combustible materials (part 1 of article 295-3 of the Criminal Code).

On November 10, 2021, the Minsk City Court sentenced Dziadok to five years in a general-security penal colony.

==== 2025 ====
Dziadok was released from prison and forcibly moved to Lithuania in September 2025 along with fifty other Belarusian political prisoners after American-Belarusian negotiations.

== Awards ==
- In May 2017, he received the Ales Korol Award in the category "Best Social and Political Material" for the article "Тунеядские протесты и перспектива Майдана" in the Novy Chas newspaper.
- In December 2017, he received the Francisk Alekhnovicha Award for the best work written in captivity (the book "Цвета параллельного мира").
- In May 2018, he received the Ales Korol Award in the category "Best Social and Political Article" for the article "Тюрьма и воля: культурный обмен".

== Bibliography ==
- The Colors of a Parallel World (Belarusian: Фарбы паралельнага свету), 2017. The book was successfully translated into German and published as Die Farben einer Parallelenwelt by edition.fotoTAPETA (Berlin, 2022). It has also been translated into English, Czech, and Polish.
- "Untouchables in prison hierarchy" — 2016 — social caste hierarchy in the Belarusian prison system
- The decision making in Hamas — 2016
- «Цвета параллельного мира» — 2017
- «Народные моджахеды: Муджахедин Хальк» — 2019
- Territorial achievements of IS outside Middle East — 2019
- «Теория интерсекциональности: анархистская критика» — 2020
- The Stories From The Pockets, 2026. A book reflecting on the realities of Grodno prison and the psychology of survival, written after his release.
