= Sternenberg, Bern =

Bernese jurisdiction (1388–1798)

Jurisdiction of Sternenberg Sternenberg
- Regional jurisdiction of the Republic of Bern
- 1388–1798
- Flag Coat of arms
- Capital: Courts at Gasel (Köniz) and Neuenegg
- History
  - Established after the Sempach War: 1388
  - Abolished by the Helvetic Republic: 1798
- Today part of: Canton of Bern, Switzerland

Sternenberg, also called the jurisdiction of Neuenegg, was a Bernese regional jurisdiction (Landgericht) that existed from 1388 to 1798.

== History ==
After the Sempach War (1388), Bern annexed the territories on the left bank of the Aare, from the Jura to the Stockhorn range, and usurped the local landgravial rights of the former landgraviate of Burgundia circa Ararim, dividing them between the jurisdictions of Seftigen and Sternenberg. On the basis of these rights, Bern progressively imposed its rule over the lordships of the region, claiming in particular the right to levy troops and taxes, as well as criminal justice. The second most important of the four Bernese jurisdictions, but the smallest in area, Sternenberg came under the banneret of the Smiths' guild. It extended from the Schwarzwasser in the south, the Sense and the Sarine in the west, to the Aare in the north and the Gurten in the east, and was divided into four districts.

The courts (Dingstätte) sat "under the great oak" at Gasel (municipality of Köniz) and "under the firs" at Neuenegg. Under the Ancien Régime, the banneret alone was competent for military administration, assisted by a local bailiff (Sautier) as executive official. In the three southeastern districts, criminal justice came under the grand bailiff of Bern, and in the fourth, in the northwest, under the bailiff of Laupen; the low-justice rights belonged to various lords. The law of the city of Bern applied to the jurisdiction of Sternenberg; the expression "territorial law of Sternenberg" denoted various privileges granted by Bern (1513/1517, 1732). The jurisdiction of Sternenberg was abolished in 1798. The eastern part (Köniz, Oberbalm) was assigned in 1803 to the bailiwick (Oberamt), later district, of Bern, and the northwestern part (Neuenegg, Laupen, Mühleberg, Frauenkappelen) to that of Laupen.

== Bibliography ==
- R. von Stürler, Die vier Berner Landgerichte Seftigen, Sternenberg, Konolfingen und Zollikofen, 1920
- A.-M. Dubler, "Die Landgrafschaften", in Archiv des Historischen Vereins des Kantons Bern, 90, 2013, 21–33
