= Laupen (disambiguation) =

There are places that have the name Laupen:

In Switzerland:

- Laupen, Bern, a municipality in the Canton of Bern
- Laupen (district), the administrative district including that municipality
- Laupen, Zurich, a town in the municipality of Rüti in the Canton of Zürich
- Laupen, St. Gallen, a hamlet on the river Thur in the Canton of St. Gallen
