= Ludwig Brüggler =

Swiss politician and soldier (died 1479)

- Died: 1479
- Occupations: Politician; soldier
- Spouses: Caecilia von Buch; Barbara von Erlach
- Father: Peter Brüggler

Ludwig Brüggler (died 1479) was a Bernese politician and soldier. He was a member of the Small Council of Bern from 1456 and banneret (Venner) from 1467, and he was banner captain (Bannerhauptmann) at Grandson in 1474 and at Murten in 1476.

== Biography ==
Ludwig Brüggler was a member of the Brüggler family and the son of Peter. He married first Caecilia, daughter of Anton von Buch and Klara von Bolligen and heiress of the lordships of Mühleberg, Riedburg, and Englisberg, and secondly Barbara von Erlach, widow of Niklaus von Wattenwil.

In Bern he became a member of the Grand Council in 1447, of the Small Council in 1456, and banneret in 1467. In between, in 1459, he was Schultheiss of Thun. He was banner bearer (Bannerträger) at Mulhouse in 1468, and banner captain at Grandson in 1474 and at Murten in 1476. He was repeatedly Bern's envoy to the Federal Diet (Tagsatzung).

Ludwig and Peter Brüggler (died 1469) were bannerets of the tanners' society (Gesellschaft zu Gerbern) and styled themselves Junker, but in the Twingherrenstreit they were not counted among the Bernese nobility.

== Bibliography ==
- H. Michel, Ratslisten 1470–1798 (manuscript, 1972, Staatsarchiv Bern)
- B. von Rodt, Genealogien burgerlicher Geschlechter der Stadt Bern, 1, 115–121 (manuscript, 1950, Burgerbibliothek Bern)
