= Gümmenenkrieg =

Coordinates: 46.945°N 7.245°E

Gümmenen War
- Part of the creation of the Swiss Confederation
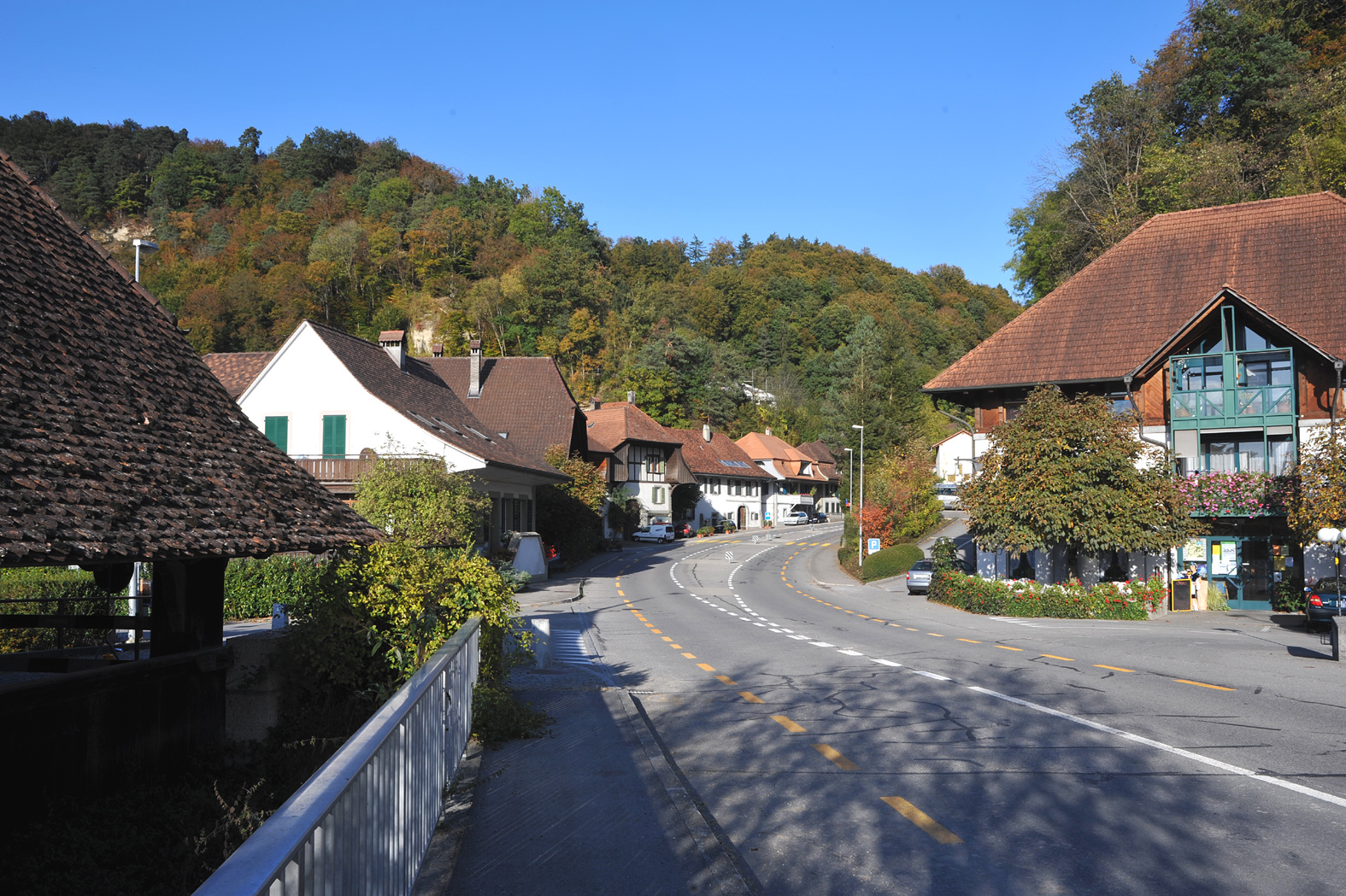
- Gümmenen village as it appear today
Date	1331–33
Location	Canton of Bern
Result	Draw

Belligerents
Bern	Fribourg

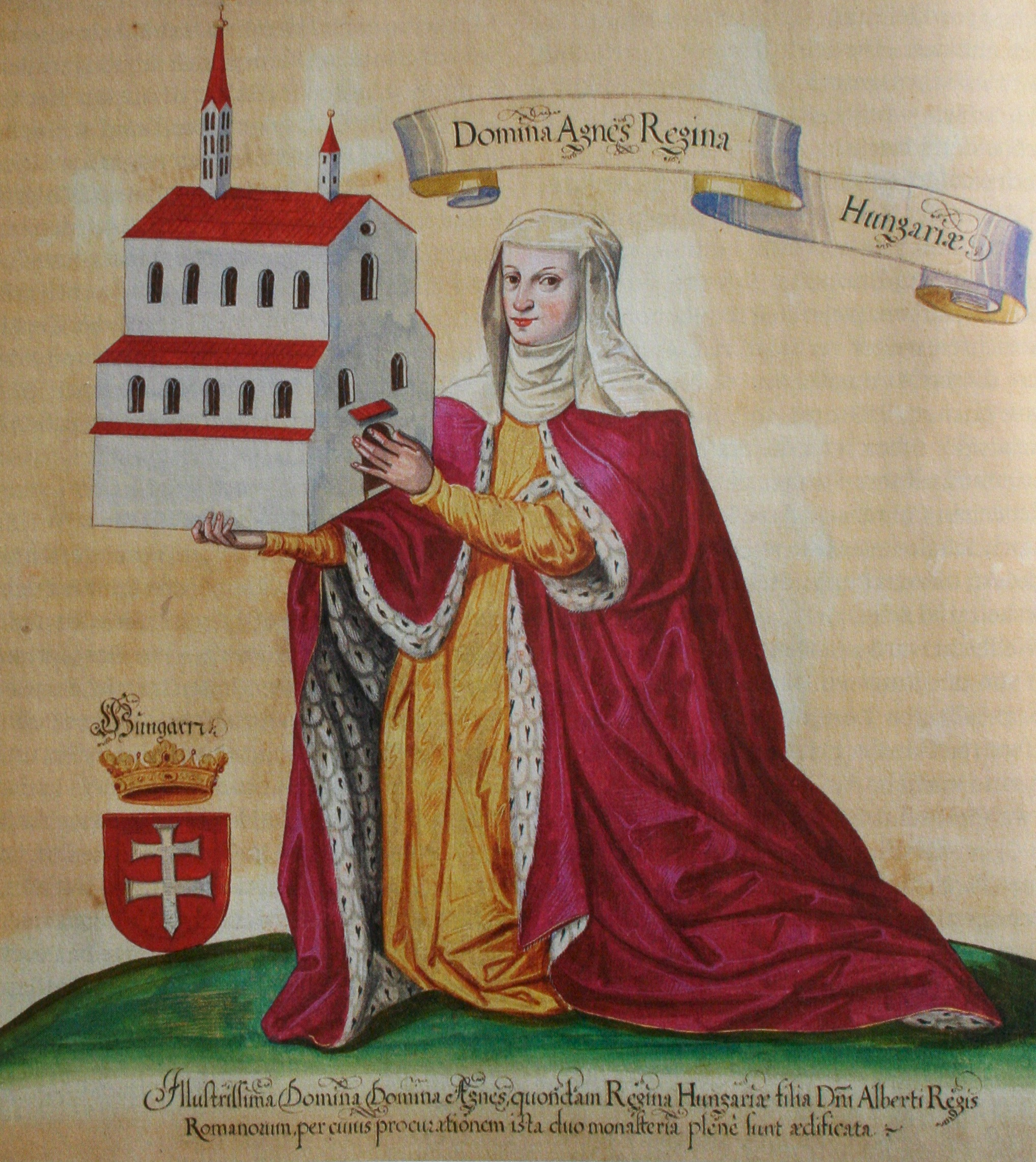
Agnes of Austria negotiated a peace between Bern and Fribourg

The Gümmenenkrieg was a war between the emergent city-states of Bern and Fribourg in 1331-33 in what is now Switzerland. The war pitted Bern and the new Swiss Confederation against the Habsburg-supported city of Fribourg and local nobles. It was also the first in a series of battles that brought the Habsburgs and Fribourg into prominence in the County of Burgundy. The war ended without resolving anything and led to other wars between Bern and Fribourg.

== History ==
In 1324, Bern purchased the bridge-head at Laupen, which brought Bern into the Fribourg controlled Sense and Saane valleys. The city of Fribourg and a number of minor nobles became concerned about Bernese territorial ambitions and began to ally with each other. In 1331, the Lords of Weissenburg, Turn and Gruyere besieged Mülenen Castle, which was held by a pledge against a loan by a citizen of Bern. Bern responded to the siege aggressively and called on its allies, Solothurn, Biel and Murten. The combined Bernese army marched on the castle at Gümmenen (now part of Mühleberg) on the Saane river and destroyed it and surrounding fortifications as well as the nearby settlement. Schönfels Castle, which was near Grasburg Castle, and the castle at Aeschi were also destroyed.

== Aftermath ==
In 1333, Queen Agnes of Austria mediated a peace treaty which returned everyone to the pre-war borders, with nothing exchanged except for prisoners. The peace treaty, however, did allow Bern to settle with the Barons of Weissenburg in 1334. Bern was able to occupy Wimmis and Unspunnen in the Bernese Oberland and begin to expand into the Oberland. Bern's continued expansion was at the expense of the feudal lords in the surrounding lands and in 1339 it led to the Battle of Laupen against Fribourg.

== See also ==
- List of battles involving the Old Swiss Confederacy
