= Riedburg =

Castle and former lordship in Köniz, Switzerland

Coordinates: 46°51′54″N 7°21′53″E

- Köniz, canton of Bern, Switzerland
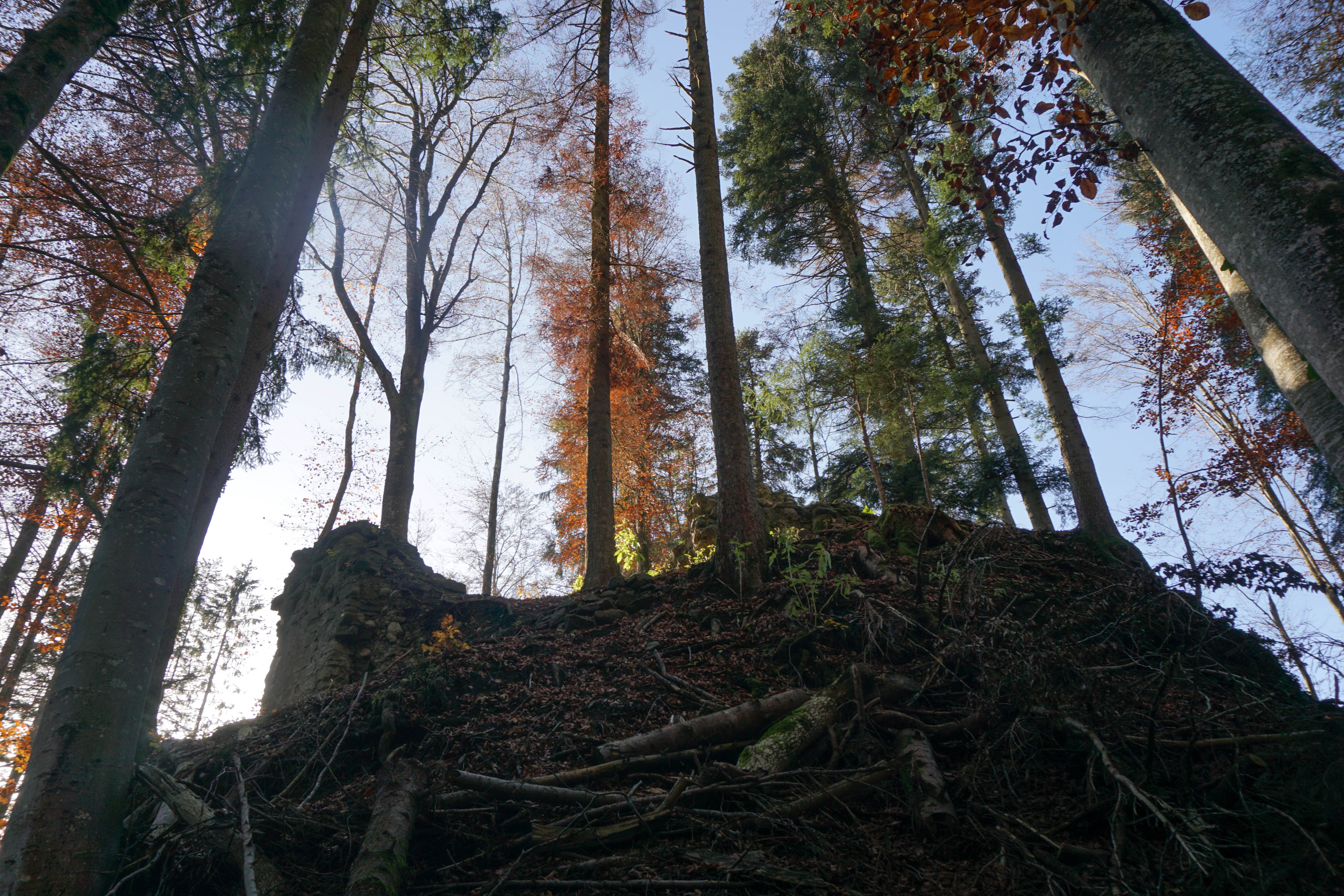

Site information
- Type: Castle
- Condition: Ruins (ditch and remains of the tower and dwelling)

Site history
- Built: First half of the 14th century (on 13th-century foundations)
- Demolished: 1386
- Events: Destroyed by Fribourg (1386)

Riedburg was a castle and former lordship in the municipality of Köniz, in the canton of Bern, Switzerland.

== Castle ==
The castle was built in the first half of the 14th century on the site of an earlier 13th-century structure, located on the old east–west road through the gorges of the Schwarzwasser. The residence of Ivo von Bolligen, who remained loyal to Bern during the Sempach War, it was destroyed by Fribourg in 1386. Today only a ditch around the site and remains of the tower and dwelling survive.

== Lordship ==
The lordship extended between the Schwarzwasser, the Sense, and the Scherlibach. Placed under the sovereignty of Bern from 1388 (the jurisdiction of Sternenberg, with the city court for criminal matters), it passed in the 15th century by marriage to burgher families of Bern (von Buch, Brüggler), who probably built the Heidenhaus at Grossgschneit to replace the castle—a timber manor of the third quarter of the 16th century on 15th-century foundations.

In 1515 the lordship (the ban and jurisdiction) was bought by a group of seven well-off peasants. The low-justice court was administered by these seven co-lords, who staffed it with local people (twelve jurors, a bailiff, and an Ammann as president); it sat publicly at the Junkernholz and later in the house of the Ammann, who held the seigneurial seal. In 1545 the peasants offered to sell the lordship to Bern, which refused, and later tried in vain to acquire it in 1626. In the 18th century several estates passed, with their share of the lordship, to patrician families: that of Farneren to the Zeerleder family (the Davidsruh country house) and that of the castle to the Stettler family (later to the Zehender and Mutach families). In 1798 the Helvetic Republic abolished the seigneurial rights.

== Bibliography ==
- Christian Lerch, Beiträge zur Geschichte der Gemeinden Köniz und Oberbalm, 1927
- Hans Ott, "Ausgrabungen auf der Ruine Riedburg", in Jahrbuch des Bernischen Historischen Museums, 39–40, 1961, 115–124
