= Laupen District =

Coordinates: 46.9°N 7.23333°E

Laupen District Amtsbezirk Laupen
- District
- Flag Coat of arms

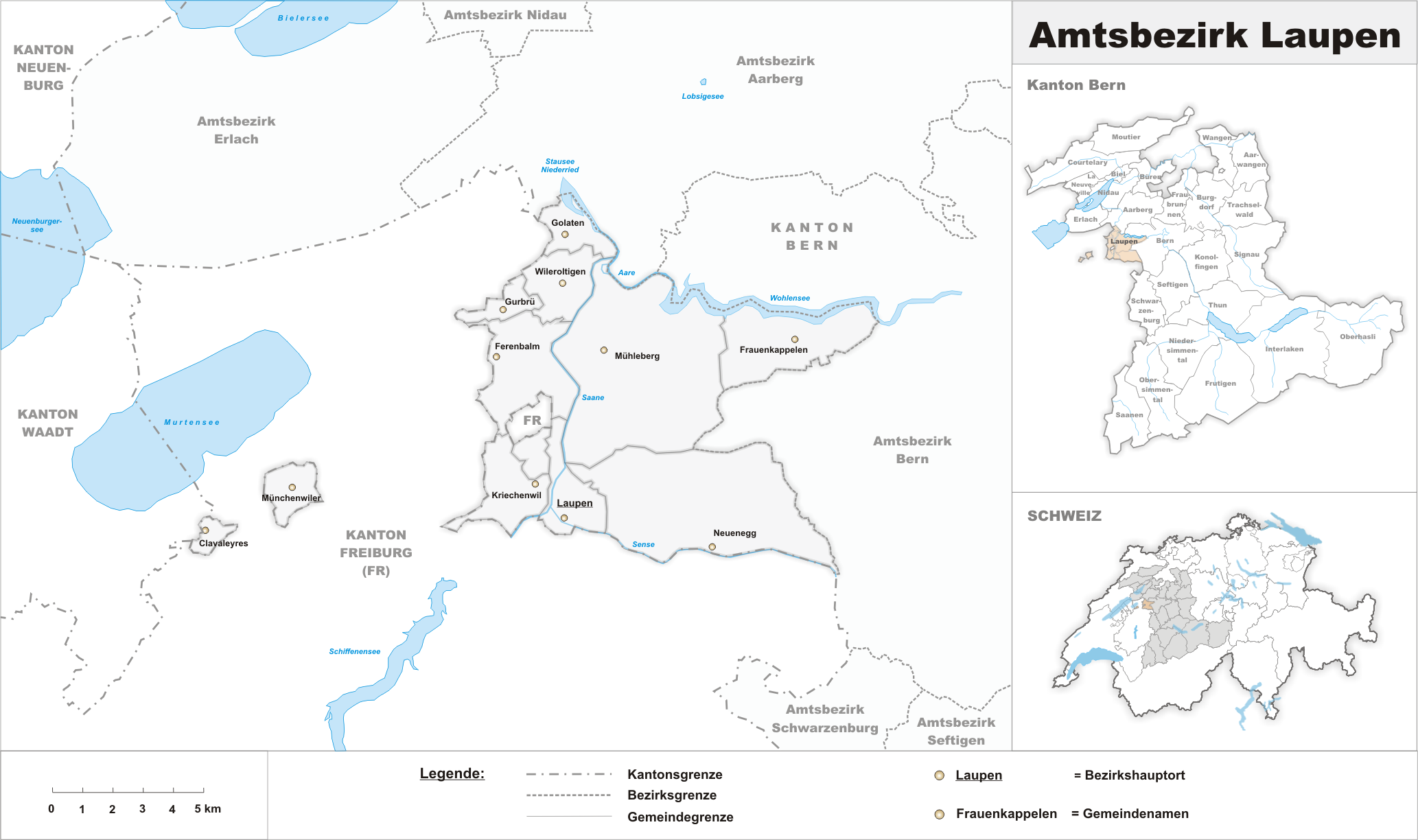
- Country: Switzerland
- Canton: Bern
- Capital: Laupen

Area
  - Total: 88 km^{2} (34 sq mi)

Population (2007)
  - Total: 14,482
  - Density: 160/km^{2} (430/sq mi)
- Time zone: UTC+1 (CET)
  - Summer (DST): UTC+2 (CEST)
- Municipalities: 11

Laupen District is one of the 26 administrative districts in the canton of Bern, Switzerland. Its capital, while having administrative power, was the municipality of Laupen.

From 1 January 2010, the district lost its administrative power while being replaced by the Bern-Mittelland (administrative district), whose administrative centre is Ostermundigen.

Since 2010, it remains therefore a fully recognised district under the law and the Constitution (Art.3 al.2) of the Canton of Berne.

The district has an area of 88 km^{2} and consisted of 11 municipalities:

Municipality	Population (Dec 2007)	Area (km^{2})
Clavaleyres	50	1.0
Ferenbalm	1,252	9.2
Frauenkappelen	1,270	9.3
Golaten	307	2.8
Gurbrü	267	1.8
Kriechenwil	398	4.8
Laupen	2,777	4.1
Mühleberg	2,664	26.3
Münchenwiler	409	2.5
Neuenegg	4,678	22.0
Wileroltigen	410	4.1

The municipalities of Clavaleyres and Münchenwiler are enclaved within the canton of Fribourg.
