= Mühleberg =

- Municipality
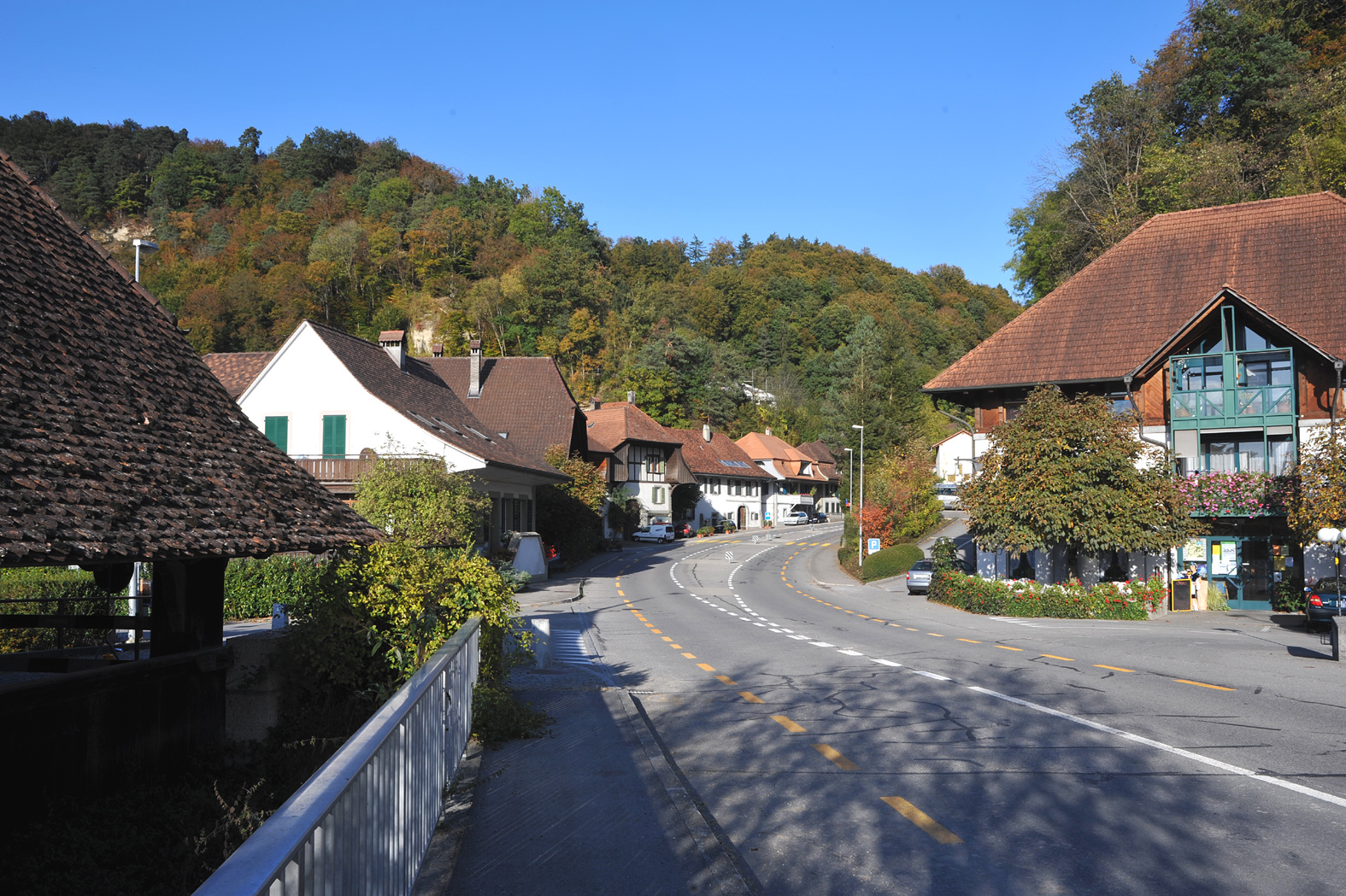

- Flag Coat of arms
- Location of Mühleberg
- Location within Switzerland Location within Canton of Bern
- Coordinates: 46°57′N 7°16′E
- Country: Switzerland
- Canton: Bern
- District: Bern-Mittelland

Government
  - Executive: Gemeinderat with 7 members
  - Mayor: Gemeindepräsident(in); Andreas Menzi (as of 2026)

Area
  - Total: 26.3 km^{2} (10.2 sq mi)
- Elevation: 557 m (1,827 ft)

Population (December 2020)
  - Total: 2,997
  - Density: 114/km^{2} (295/sq mi)
- Time zone: UTC+01:00 (CET)
  - Summer (DST): UTC+02:00 (CEST)
- Postal codes: 3203 (Mühleberg); 3205 (Gümmenen)
- SFOS number: 668
- ISO 3166 code: CH-BE
- Localities: Allenlüften, Aumatt, Brand, Buch bei Mühleberg, Buttenried, Dällenbach, Eggenberg, Fluh, Fuchsenried, Gäu, Grossmühleberg, Gümmenau, Gümmenen, Haselholz, Heggidorn, Juchlishaus, Kirchmoos, Ledi, Mädersforst, Marfeldingen, Mauss, Michelsforst, Mühleberg, Niederruntigen, Oberei bei Mühleberg, Rosshäusern, Rüplisried, Rüplisried‑Mauss, Salzweid, Schnurrenmühle, Spengelried, Strassacker, Trüllern, Zihlacker
- Surrounded by: Bern, Ferenbalm, Frauenkappelen, Golaten, Laupen, Neuenegg, Radelfingen, Wileroltigen, Wohlen bei Bern
- Twin towns: Schwanfeld (Germany)
- Website: www.muehleberg.ch

Mühleberg is a municipality in the Bern-Mittelland administrative district in the canton of Bern in Switzerland.

== History ==
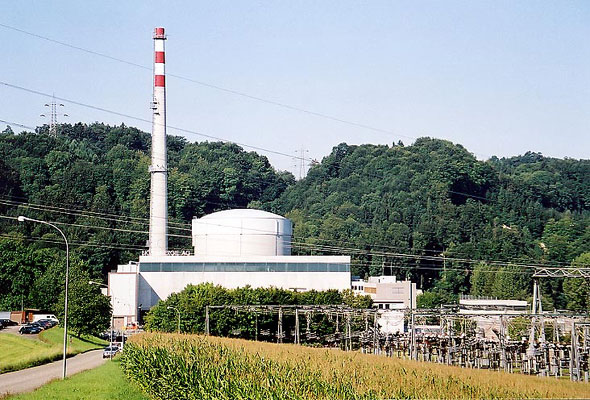
Mühleberg Nuclear Power Plant

Mühleberg is first mentioned in 1011–16 as Mulinberg.

There are several Hallstatt era grave mounds around Mühleberg; the most important is the so-called Unghürhubel (monster hill). At Unghürhubel in 1869, an ornamented choker made of heavy gold plate and a gold bracelet or strip with four rows with half-moon shapes were discovered. A number of other less valuable artifacts and metal items were probably destroyed during the excavation.

The church and village of Mühleberg belonged to a cadet branch of the von Buch family starting in 1387. It was then owned by the Brüggler family (starting in 1440) and the Herren family (in 1579), who sold it to Bern in 1599. It was combined with several other small estates and placed under the bailiwick of Laupen.

St. Martin's Church was first mentioned in 1224, though it was originally a romanesque aisleless church from the 11th century. The church tower was from the 12th century. It was expanded in 1523–24 with a new choir and became the parish church of a large parish. After the Protestant Reformation, the parish included Frauenkappelen.

The hydroelectric plant was built in 1917–21, which created Lake Wohlen. The Mühleberg Nuclear Power Plant was built in 1967–71. Both plants provide power to Bern. Following the Chernobyl disaster, public opinion swung against the power plant. In 1992, a public referendum in the canton of Bern rejected granting an unlimited operating license to the power plant, with 51% voting against. In 2003, 68% of the population rejected the initiative named Strom ohne Atom, that proposed that the plant should be shut down in 2005 to be replaced by non-nuclear power generation. A similar proposal at cantonal level had already been rejected in 2000 by 64% of voters. The two power plants remain the largest employers in the municipality.

=== Gümmenen ===
Gümmenen was the site of a medieval castle and village on the banks of the Saane river. It was first mentioned in 1252 as Guminun and in 1259 it was called, in Latin, Contamina or Condamina.

Gümmenen Castle, of which nothing remains, was built by either the Counts of Burgundy or the Dukes of Zähringen as part of the defenses along the Saane, along with Laupen Castle and Grasburg Castle. The castle was built to defend a bridge over the river. By 1391, a village (villa inferiori Dicti castri) had developed around the bridge. In 1259, Peter of Savoy made Gümmenen into an imperial fief and imperial castellans took over the castle and village. In 1282–83 King Rudolph I of Germany forced the Savoy castellan out and granted it to a Habsburg knight, Ulrich II of Maggenberg as a fief. Ulrich's heirs sold the castle, ferry and ford to Fribourg in 1319. Fribourg then granted the lands to the knights of Vuippens, who lost it back to either the Holy Roman Empire or Fribourg in 1325. The castle and village were besieged and destroyed in 1333 during Bern and Fribourg's first war over the Sense and Saane valleys, the Gümmenenkrieg. The peace treaty brokered in 1333 by Queen Agnes returned Gümmenen to Fribourg.

Fribourg granted Gümmenen to one of their citizens, but in 1389, Bern acquired the usufruct right to Gümmenen. Then, during the 1447–48 Freiburg War Bern established a Bernese court in Gümmenen. Bern received the rights to the village in the peace treaty that ended the war. Around 1450, they built the first wooden bridge over the river. In 1454, Bern gave the village back to Fribourg, but in 1467 the Bern-Fribourg border was fixed on the right bank of the Saane river and Gümmenen was assigned back to Bern.

The current old village was built during the 17th and 18th centuries. The current wooden bridge was built in 1732–39. The village developed as a small border crossing. It had two taverns, a forge and a customs and guard house at the wooden bridge. It remained a customs and guard station until 1853, when internal tolls were abolished in the new Swiss federal state.

== Geography ==
Mühleberg has an area of 26.26 km^{2} (10.14 sq mi). Of this area, 14.02 km^{2} (5.41 mi^{2}) or 53.4% is used for agricultural purposes, while 8.63 km^{2} (3.33 mi^{2}) or 32.9% is forested. Of the rest of the land, 2.42 km^{2} (0.93 mi^{2}) or 9.2% is settled (buildings or roads), 1.18 km^{2} (0.46 mi^{2}) or 4.5% is either rivers or lakes and 0.04 km^{2} (9.9 acres) or 0.2% is unproductive land.

Of the built up area, housing and buildings made up 3.2% and transportation infrastructure made up 4.0%. Power and water infrastructure as well as other special developed areas made up 1.4% of the area Out of the forested land, 31.3% of the total land area is heavily forested and 1.6% is covered with orchards or small clusters of trees. Of the agricultural land, 39.1% is used for growing crops and 12.6% is pastures, while 1.7% is used for orchards or vine crops. Of the water in the municipality, 2.7% is in lakes and 1.8% is in rivers and streams.

It is located in a triangle between the Saane/Sarine River, Aare River and Lake Wohlen. It consists of numerous hamlets and individual farm houses.

== Coat of arms ==
The blazon of the municipal coat of arms is Sable a Mill Wheel Or on a Mount of 3 Coupeaux Vert.

== Demographics ==
Mühleberg has a population (as of December 2020) of 2,997. As of 2010, 6.2% of the population are resident foreign nationals. Over the last 10 years (2000–2010) the population has changed at a rate of -5.9%. Migration accounted for -6%, while births and deaths accounted for 1.9%.

Most of the population (as of 2000) speaks German (2,579 or 94.7%) as their first language, French is the second most common (36 or 1.3%) and Albanian is the third (23 or 0.8%). There are 7 people who speak Italian and 1 person who speaks Romansh.

As of 2008, the population was 50.0% male and 50.0% female. The population was made up of 1,237 Swiss men (46.6% of the population) and 91 (3.4%) non-Swiss men. There were 1,253 Swiss women (47.2%) and 73 (2.8%) non-Swiss women. Of the population in the municipality, 917 or about 33.7% were born in Mühleberg and lived there in 2000. There were 1,154 or 42.4% who were born in the same canton, while 381 or 14.0% were born somewhere else in Switzerland, and 185 or 6.8% were born outside of Switzerland.

As of 2000, children and teenagers (0–19 years old) make up 21.6% of the population, while adults (20–64 years old) make up 66.3% and seniors (over 64 years old) make up 12.1%.

As of 2000, there were 1,093 people who were single and never married in the municipality. There were 1,371 married individuals, 137 widows or widowers and 121 individuals who are divorced.

As of 2000, there were 1,139 private households in the municipality, and an average of 2.4 persons per household. There were 304 households that consist of only one person and 66 households with five or more people. In 2000, a total of 1,104 apartments (93.4% of the total) were permanently occupied, while 56 apartments (4.7%) were seasonally occupied and 22 apartments (1.9%) were empty. As of 2009, the construction rate of new housing units was 2.3 new units per 1000 residents. The vacancy rate for the municipality, in 2010, was 0.25%.

The historical population is given in the following chart:

== Heritage sites of national significance ==
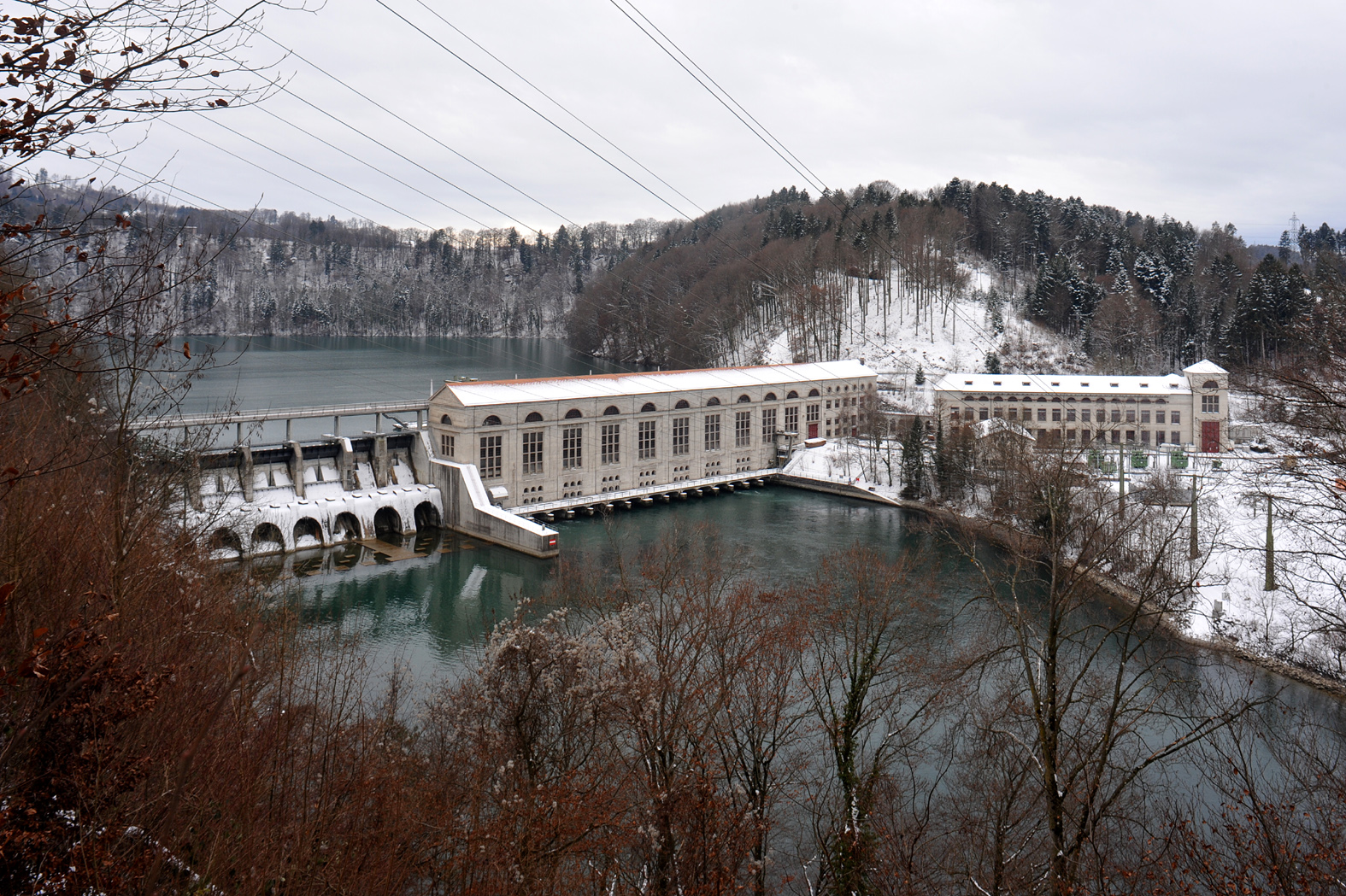
Mühleberg power plant

The Railroad-Viaduct BN over the Saane (shared with Ferenbalm) is listed as a Swiss heritage site of national significance. The entire Mühleberg power plant is part of the Inventory of Swiss Heritage Sites.

== Politics ==
In the 2007 federal election the most popular party was the SVP which received 41.24% of the vote. The next three most popular parties were the FDP (16.95%), the SPS (16.14%) and the Green Party (10.48%). In the federal election, a total of 981 votes were cast, and the voter turnout was 46.2%.

== Economy ==
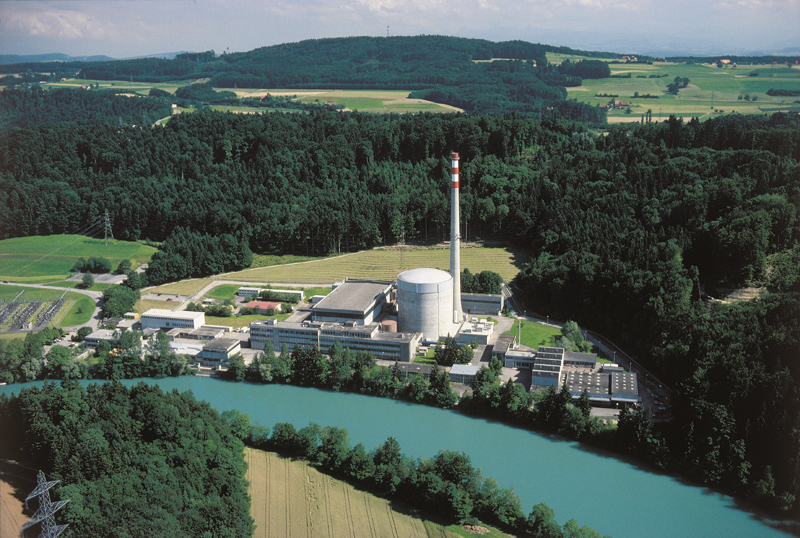
Mühleberg Nuclear Power Plant

As of 2010, Mühleberg had an unemployment rate of 1.5%. As of 2008, there were 216 people employed in the primary economic sector and about 77 businesses involved in this sector. 587 people were employed in the secondary sector and there were 41 businesses in this sector. 373 people were employed in the tertiary sector, with 81 businesses in this sector.

In 2008 the total number of full-time equivalent jobs was 990. The number of jobs in the primary sector was 137, all of which were in agriculture. The number of jobs in the secondary sector was 560 of which 82 or (14.6%) were in manufacturing and 142 (25.4%) were in construction. The number of jobs in the tertiary sector was 293. In the tertiary sector; 88 or 30.0% were in wholesale or retail sales or the repair of motor vehicles, 21 or 7.2% were in the movement and storage of goods, 39 or 13.3% were in a hotel or restaurant, 1 was in the information industry, 6 or 2.0% were the insurance or financial industry, 42 or 14.3% were technical professionals or scientists, 27 or 9.2% were in education and 7 or 2.4% were in health care.

In 2000, there were 588 workers who commuted into the municipality and 974 workers who commuted away. The municipality is a net exporter of workers, with about 1.7 workers leaving the municipality for every one entering. Of the working population, 22.6% used public transportation to get to work, and 53% used a private car.

=== Power plants ===
Mühleberg is known for its nuclear power plant, Kernkraftwerk Mühleberg. In addition the municipality has a hydroelectric power station that began operation in 1921 and has created the reservoir Lake Wohlen.

== Religion ==
From the 2000 census, 242 or 8.9% were Roman Catholic, while 2,128 or 78.2% belonged to the Swiss Reformed Church. Of the rest of the population, there were 6 members of an Orthodox church (or about 0.22% of the population), there were 3 individuals (or about 0.11% of the population) who belonged to the Christian Catholic Church, and there were 106 individuals (or about 3.89% of the population) who belonged to another Christian church. There were 34 (or about 1.25% of the population) who were Islamic. There were 9 individuals who were Buddhist, 12 individuals who were Hindu and 3 individuals who belonged to another church. 147 (or about 5.40% of the population) belonged to no church, are agnostic or atheist, and 83 individuals (or about 3.05% of the population) did not answer the question.

== Education ==
In Mühleberg about 1,210 or (44.5%) of the population have completed non-mandatory upper secondary education, and 396 or (14.5%) have completed additional higher education (either university or a Fachhochschule). Of the 396 who completed tertiary schooling, 72.7% were Swiss men, 22.7% were Swiss women, 2.8% were non-Swiss men and 1.8% were non-Swiss women.

The Canton of Bern school system provides one year of non-obligatory Kindergarten, followed by six years of Primary school. This is followed by three years of obligatory lower Secondary school where the students are separated according to ability and aptitude. Following the lower Secondary students may attend additional schooling or they may enter an apprenticeship.

During the 2009-10 school year, there were a total of 273 students attending classes in Mühleberg. There were 2 kindergarten classes with a total of 47 students in the municipality. Of the kindergarten students, 2.1% were permanent or temporary residents of Switzerland (not citizens) and 4.3% have a different mother language than the classroom language. The municipality had 6 primary classes and 112 students. Of the primary students, 1.8% were permanent or temporary residents of Switzerland (not citizens) and 5.4% have a different mother language than the classroom language. During the same year, there were 7 lower secondary classes with a total of 114 students. There were 5.3% who were permanent or temporary residents of Switzerland (not citizens) and 2.6% have a different mother language than the classroom language.

As of 2000, there were 49 students in Mühleberg who came from another municipality, while 75 residents attended schools outside the municipality.

Mühleberg is home to the Bibliothek Mühleberg library. The library has (as of 2008) 8,702 books or other media, and loaned out 9,573 items in the same year. It was open a total of 224 days with average of 8 hours per week during that year.

== Transportation ==
The municipality has a railway station, Rosshäusern, on the Bern–Neuchâtel line.
