= Ernst Wilczek =

Swiss botanist and pharmacist (1867–1948)

Ernst Wilczek (12 January 1867 in Laupen – 30 September 1948 in Lausanne) was a Swiss botanist and pharmacist.

In 1892, he obtained his PhD from the University of Zurich, subsequently becoming an associate professor of systematic and pharmaceutical botany at the University of Lausanne. From 1902 to 1934, he served as a full professor at the university, and in 1910, he was appointed director of the École de pharmacie in Lausanne. He also served as director of the Pont de Nant alpine garden until his retirement in 1934, when he received the status of professor emeritus.

As a botanist, Wilczek traveled to Argentina, where he crossed the Andes in 1897–98. In 1898, he also collected specimens in Corsica and the Maritime Alps with fellow Swiss botanist Emile Burnat. Later in his career, he focused on North African flora, being credited with making seven scientific trips to Morocco between 1921 and 1936.

He made contributions to Schinz and Keller's Flore de la Suisse, and collaborated with Robert Chodat on the treatise. Contributions a la flore de la République Argentine.

In 1925, Charles Meylan named the genus Wilczekia (family Didymiaceae) in his honor.
