= Laupen Castle =

Castle in Laupen, Switzerland

Coordinates: 46°54′08″N 7°14′30″E

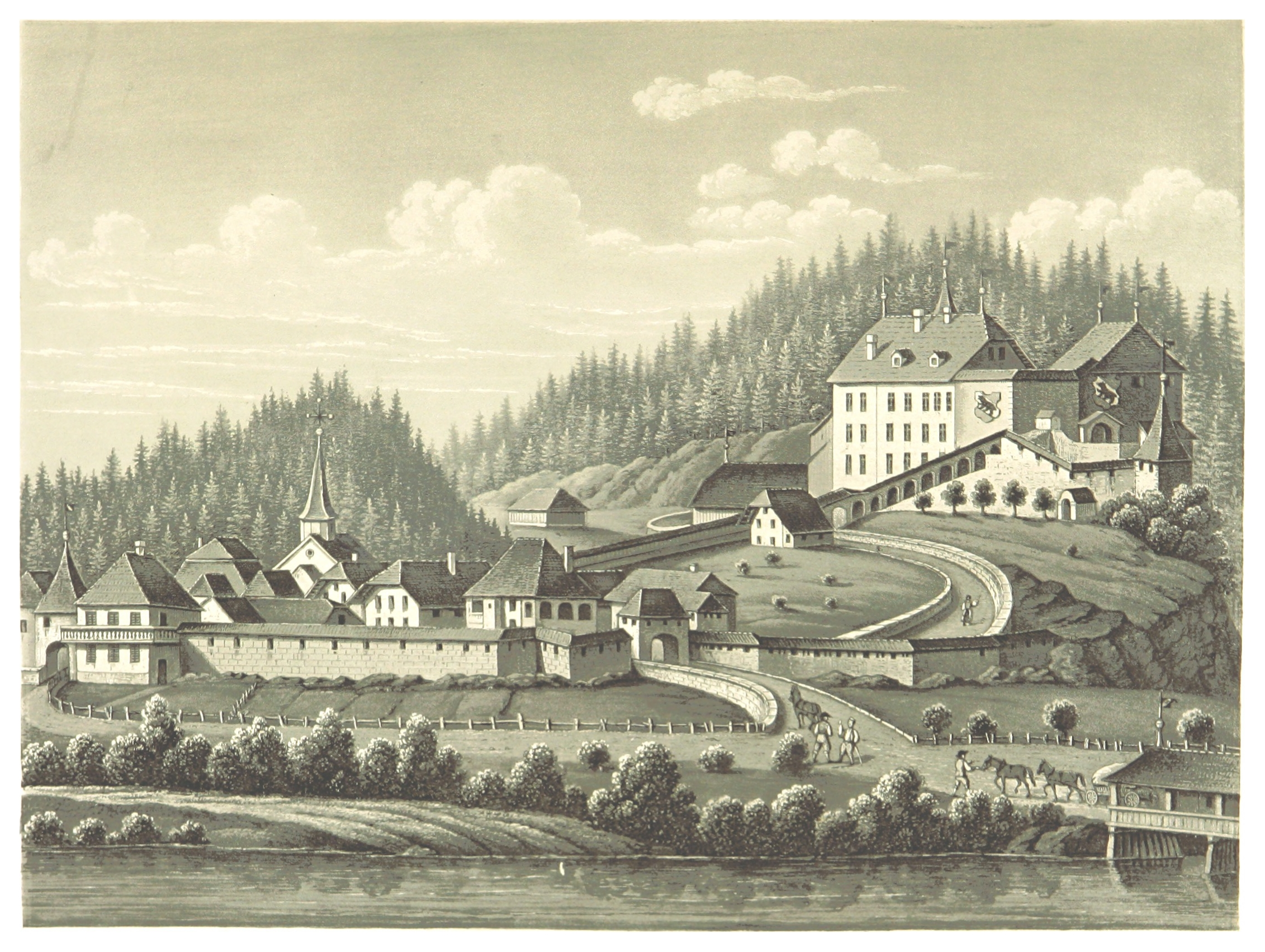
Laupen (c.1850)

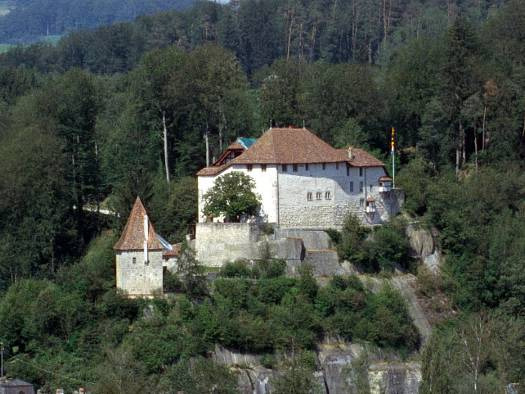
Laupen Castle as seen from the south

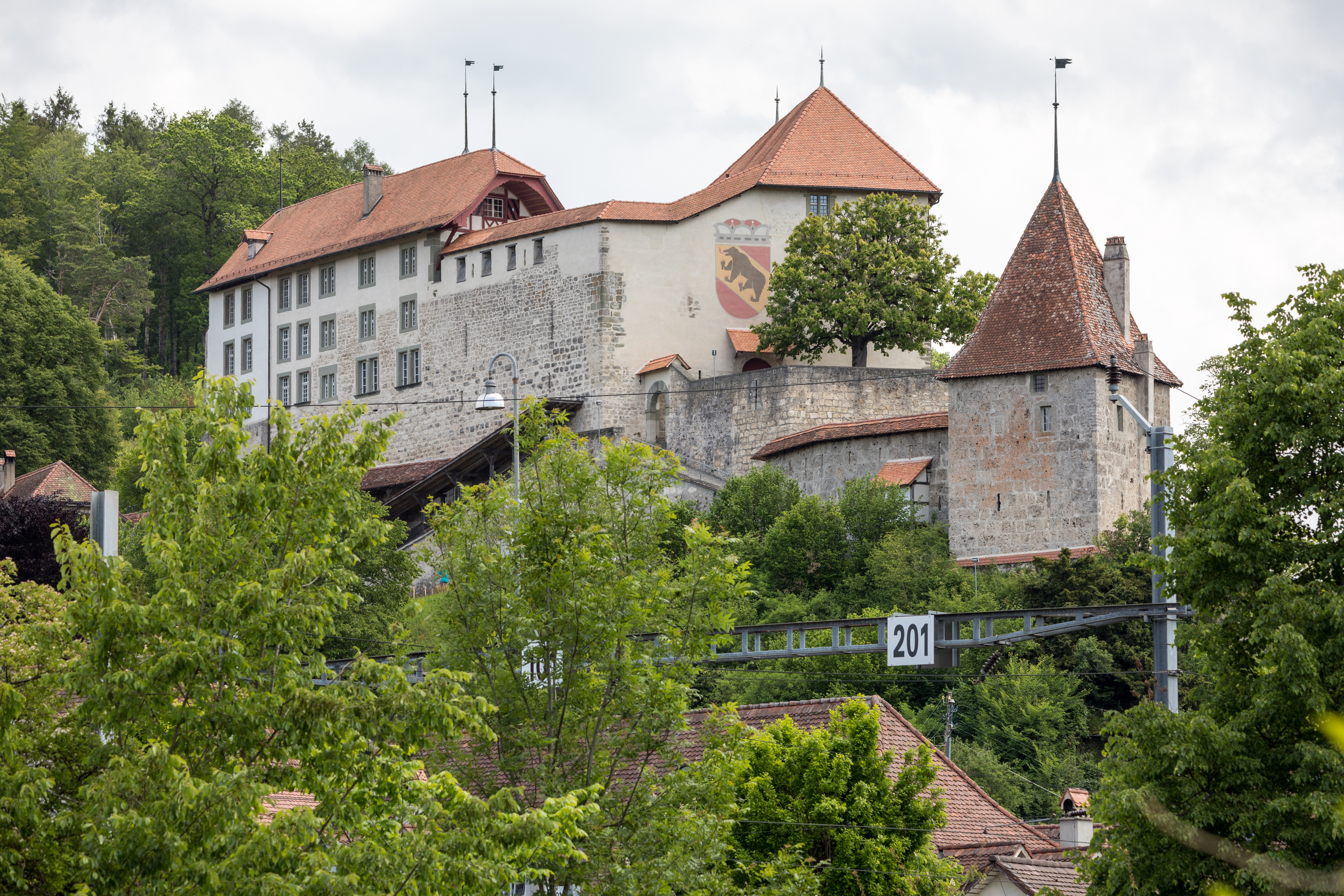
West view of Laupen Castle

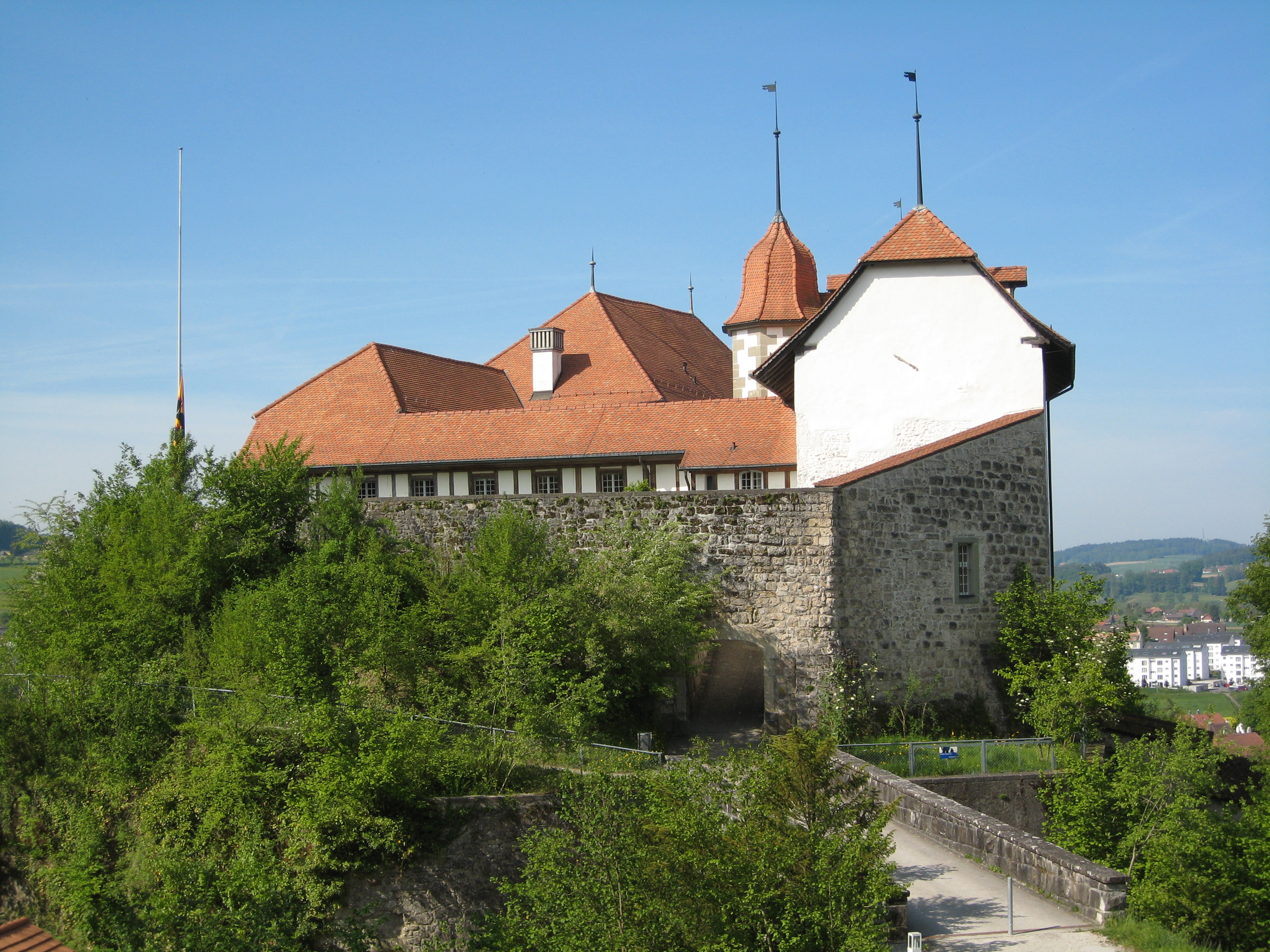
The castle as seen from the north

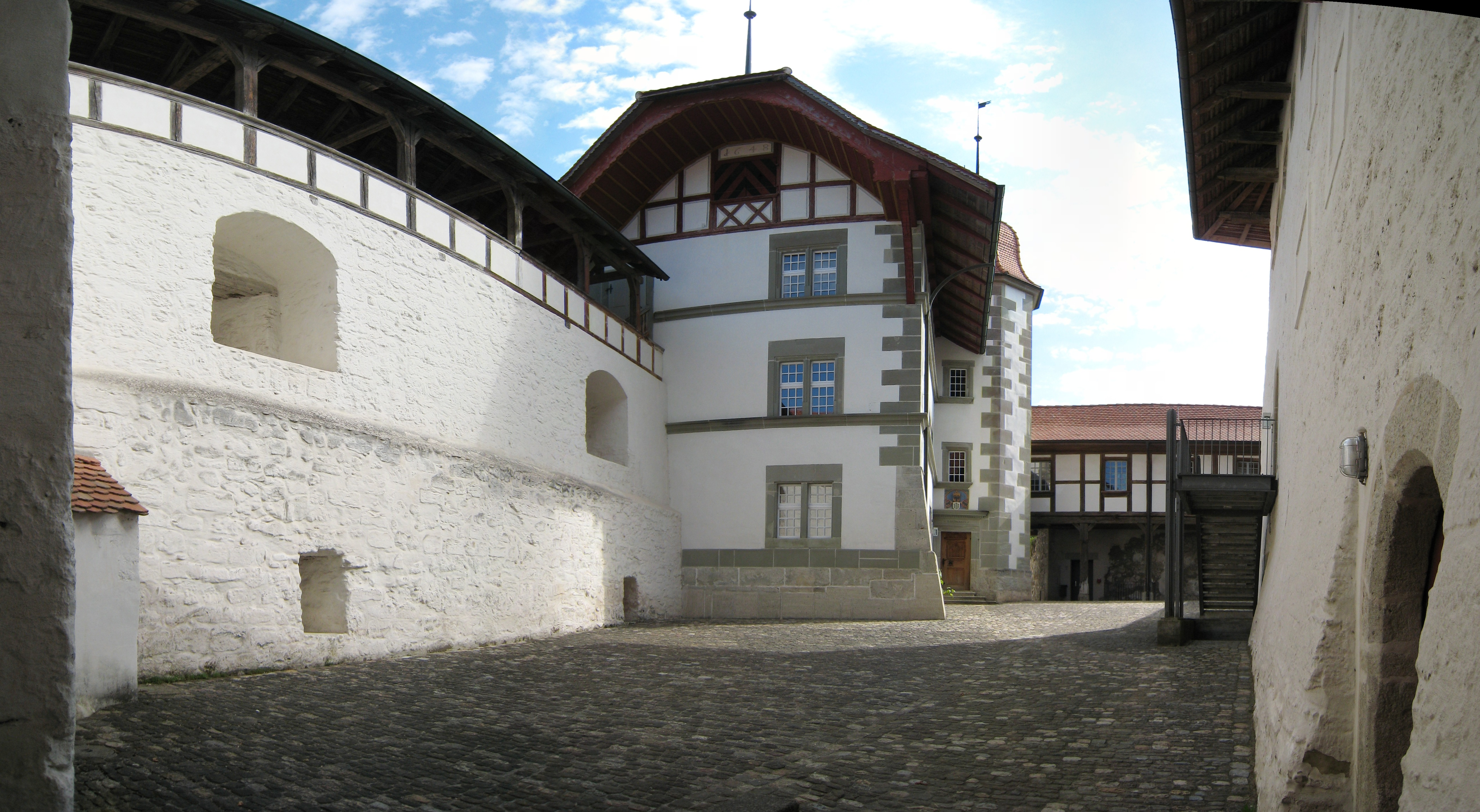
The interior courtyard of the castle

Laupen Castle (German: Schloss Laupen) is a castle in the municipality of Laupen of the Canton of Bern in Switzerland. It is a Swiss heritage site of national significance.

== Building ==
Laupen is an exposed medieval fortification on a rocky outcrop. Its strength was based on terrain changes, the neck ditch separating it from the adjacent mountain, and its fortifications, namely the main defense tower and the massive, elliptical circular wall (2.5–3 m thick, 10–12 m high). Important sections of this have been preserved as magnificent rusticated ashlar masonry at their original height. The south, west, and north sides are largely intact, while the tower and the east side remain only as bases.

The most valuable part of the complex is the Palas (palace) , attached to the ring wall, whose three pointed-arch double windows illuminate the massive Knights' Hall . This is one of the best-preserved castle halls in Switzerland, built around 1315, with an intact fireplace, massive beamed ceiling, and exposed brickwork. Above it rises the former residential floor under a huge hipped roof dating from 1395.

== See also ==
- List of castles in Switzerland
