= Frauenkappelen =

- Municipality
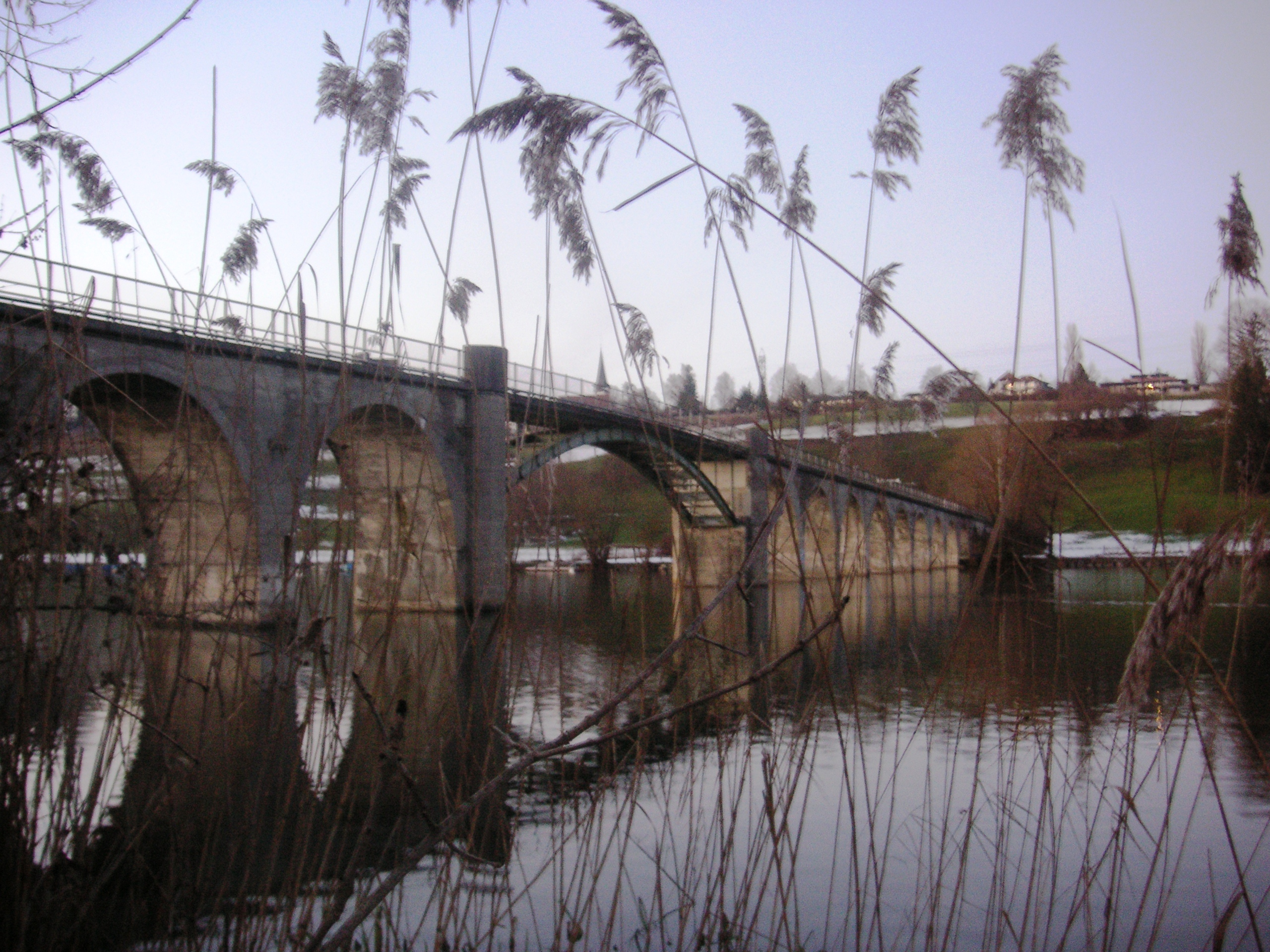

- Flag Coat of arms
- Location of Frauenkappelen
- Location within Switzerland Location within Canton of Bern
- Coordinates: 46°57′N 7°20′E
- Country: Switzerland
- Canton: Bern
- District: Bern-Mittelland

Government
  - Executive: Gemeinderat with 7 members
  - Mayor: Gemeindepräsident; Marc Wyttenbach (as of 2026)

Area
  - Total: 9.3 km^{2} (3.6 sq mi)
- Elevation: 601 m (1,972 ft)

Population (December 2020)
  - Total: 1,320
  - Density: 140/km^{2} (370/sq mi)
- Time zone: UTC+01:00 (CET)
  - Summer (DST): UTC+02:00 (CEST)
- Postal code: 3202
- SFOS number: 663
- ISO 3166 code: CH-BE
- Surrounded by: Bern, Mühleberg, Wohlen bei Bern
- Website: www.frauenkappelen.ch

Frauenkappelen is a municipality in the Bern-Mittelland administrative district in the canton of Bern in Switzerland.

== History ==
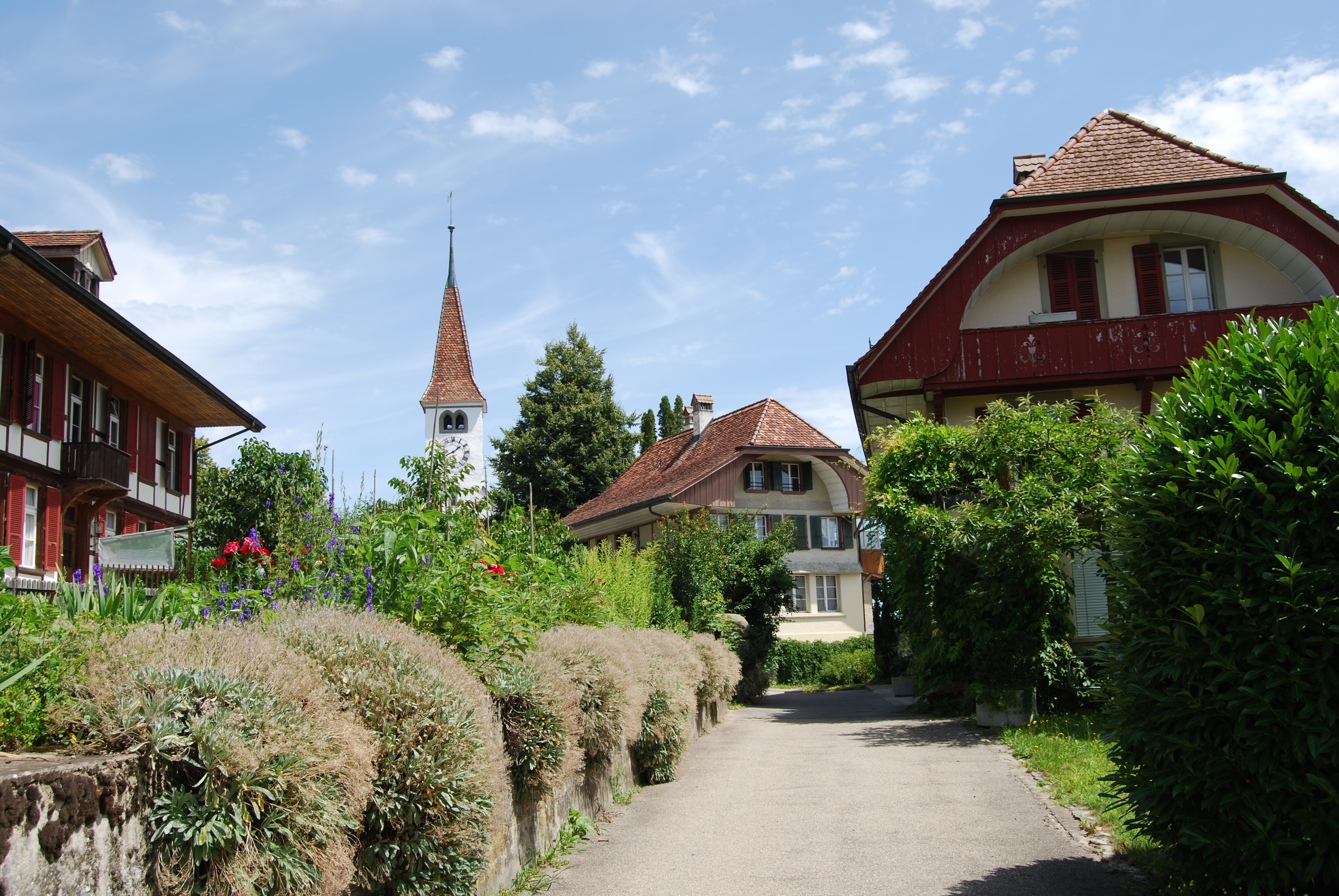
Frauenkappelen church and village

Frauenkappelen is first mentioned in 1158 as Capela. In 1574 the town became a parish.

The oldest traces of a settlement in the area are several Hallstatt era grave mounds in the Spilwald forest. A Roman era estate has also been found in the woods. It appears that the area around the modern municipality was abandoned until the Early Middle Ages. By 1241 the Alt-Bubenberg Castle was built on the hills above the Aare river. Between 1228 and 1240, the Augustinian Sancta Maria de Cappellis Abbey was built in Foresto. Over the following centuries Alt-Bubenberg Castle lost its importance and was abandoned in the 14th century. Today only the ruins of the walls are still visible.

The Abbey, on the other hand, grew with donations from local nobles. By the 14th century it owned land throughout the Sense valley, especially around the town of Rüti bei Büren. The Abbey also owned vineyards along Lake Biel. The Abbey had its own seal in 1251. It had about ten nuns under an Abbess with a provost supplied from another Abbey. Initially the Abbey was under the Augustinian Köniz Abbey, until was absorbed by the Teutonic Knights in 1226 or 1235. After that the provost was appointed by a local committee or by the Bishop of Lausanne. In 1486 the newly created college of canons at the Cathedral of Bern acquired the entire Abbey and its lands. The remaining six nuns were allowed to remain at the Abbey for the rest of their lives. The Abbey church was initially part of the parish of Mühleberg. It remained part of the parish after the Canton of Bern converted to the new faith during the Protestant Reformation. When it was rebuilt in 1574, it became the parish church for the new Frauenkappelen parish. The Abbey buildings were used as a rectory until they were demolished in 1640.

In 1742-48 Bern built a road from Murten to Bern to Lausanne and Frauenkappelen was the first way station out of Bern on the road. An inn, a blacksmith, a general store and a pilgrim's hostel were built for the travelers. However, the municipality remained generally rural until the 1960s when the expanding agglomeration of Bern brought factories and commuters to the municipality. During the same decade the Federal Bureau for Infantry moved into the municipality. Today Frauenkappelen is a mostly rural community on the outskirts of the suburbs of Bern.

== Geography ==
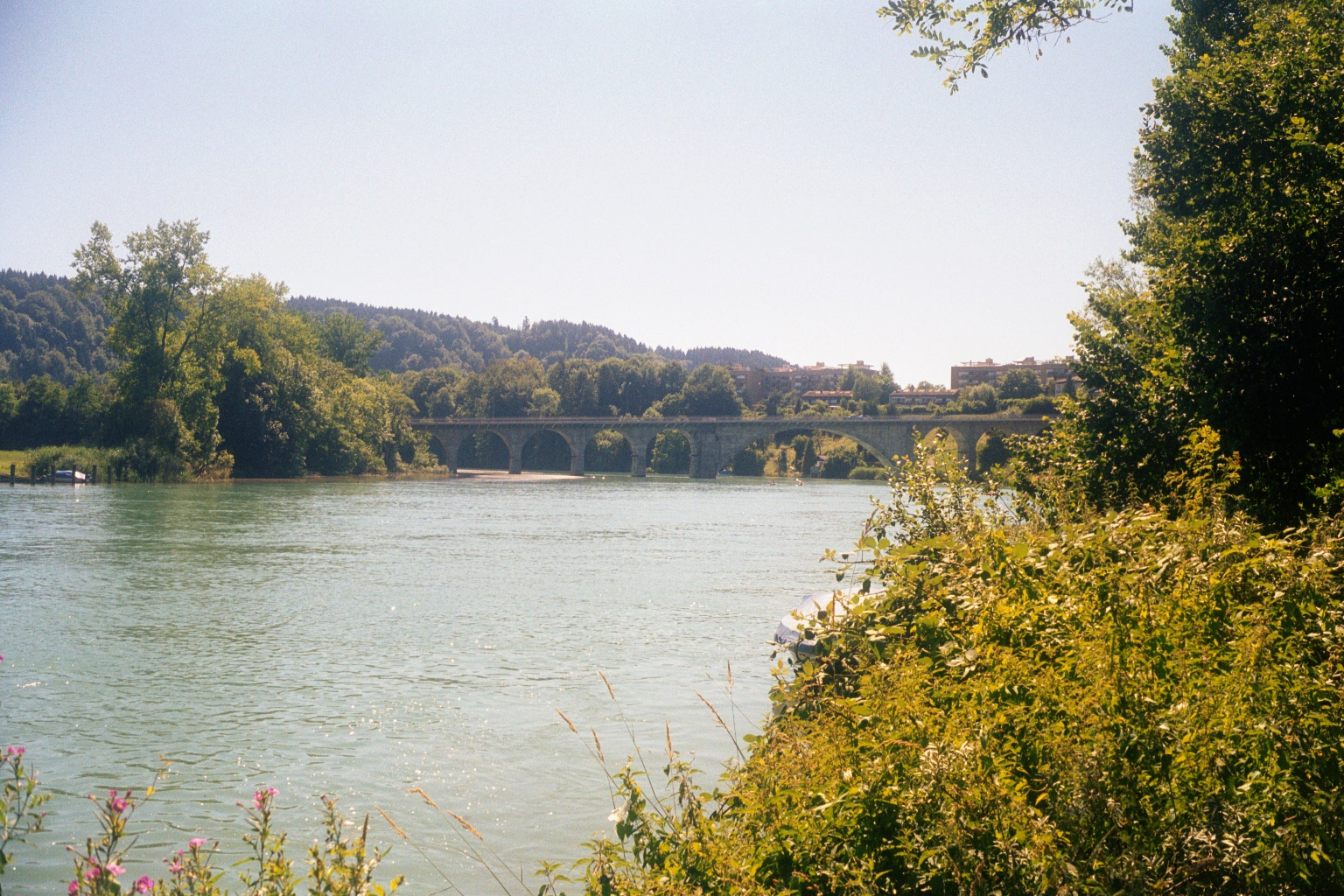
Kappelen Bridge, looking from Wohlen toward Frauenkappelen

Frauenkappelen has an area of 9.29 km^{2} (3.59 sq mi). As of 2012, a total of 3.92 km^{2} (1.51 mi^{2}) or 42.3% is used for agricultural purposes, while 3.81 km^{2} (1.47 mi^{2}) or 41.1% is forested. Of the rest of the land, 0.63 km^{2} (0.24 mi^{2}) or 6.8% is settled (buildings or roads), 0.86 km^{2} (0.33 mi^{2}) or 9.3% is either rivers or lakes and 0.07 km^{2} (17 acres) or 0.8% is unproductive land.

During the same year, housing and buildings made up 3.5% and transportation infrastructure made up 2.7%. Out of the forested land, all of the forested land area is covered with heavy forests. Of the agricultural land, 28.6% is used for growing crops and 12.3% is pastures, while 1.4% is used for orchards or vine crops. All the water in the municipality is in lakes.

It is located on a terrace between Lake Wohlen and the Gäbelbach. It includes the village of Frauenkappelen, several small hamlets and scattered individual houses.

On 31 December 2009 Amtsbezirk Laupen, the municipality's former district, was dissolved. On the following day, 1 January 2010, it joined the newly created Verwaltungskreis Bern-Mittelland.

== Coat of arms ==
The blazon of the municipal coat of arms is Azure two Croziers Or in saltire and overall a Cross pattee fichee Argent.

== Demographics ==
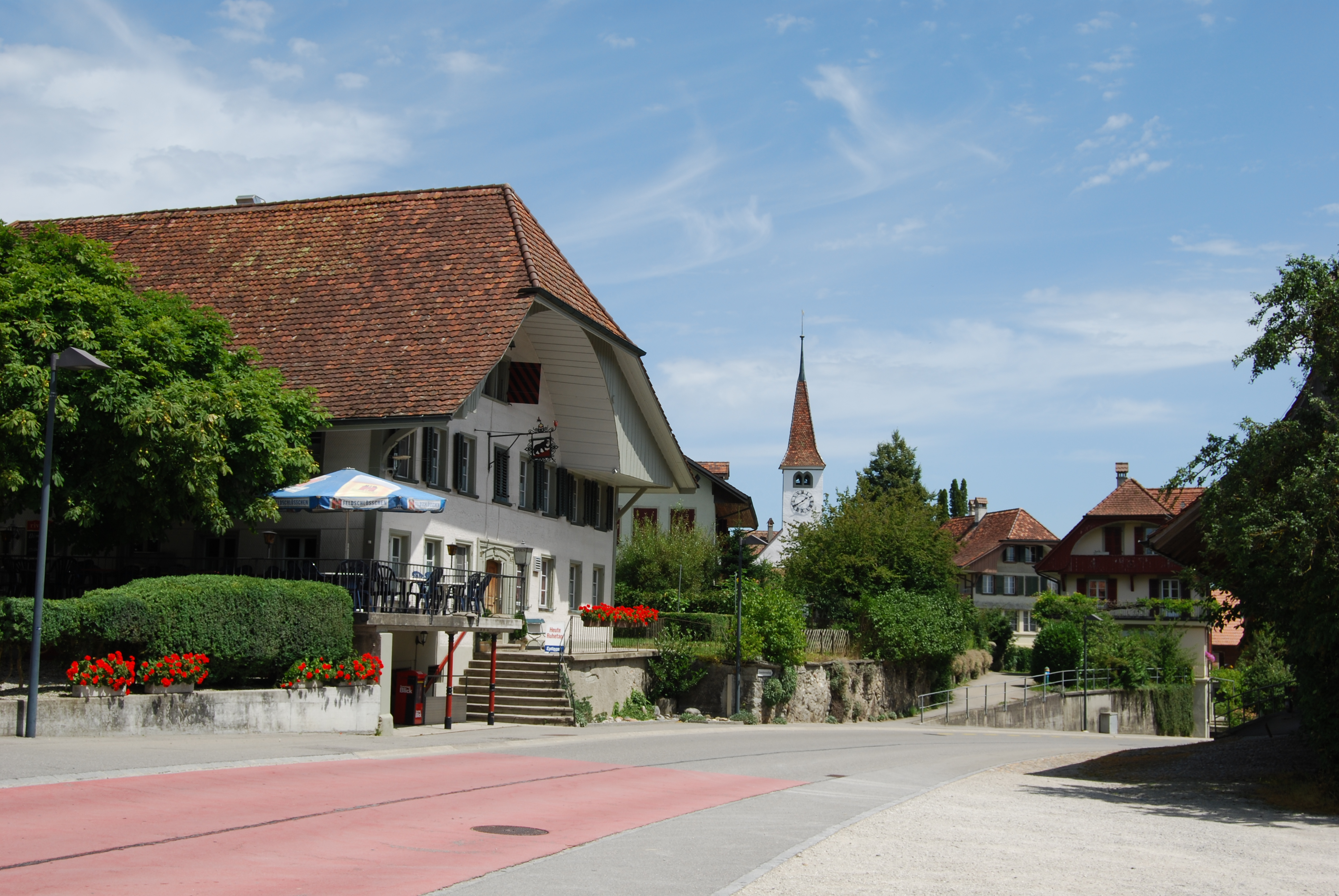
Frauenkappelen village

Frauenkappelen has a population (as of December 2020) of 1,320. As of 2010, 6.9% of the population are resident foreign nationals. Over the last 10 years (2001-2011) the population has changed at a rate of -1.4%. Migration accounted for -1.6%, while births and deaths accounted for -0.1%.

Most of the population (as of 2000) speaks German (1,214 or 94.8%) as their first language, French is the second most common (19 or 1.5%) and Albanian is the third (9 or 0.7%). There are 8 people who speak Italian and 2 people who speak Romansh.

As of 2008, the population was 49.7% male and 50.3% female. The population was made up of 577 Swiss men (45.6% of the population) and 51 (4.0%) non-Swiss men. There were 600 Swiss women (47.5%) and 36 (2.8%) non-Swiss women. Of the population in the municipality, 359 or about 28.0% were born in Frauenkappelen and lived there in 2000. There were 610 or 47.7% who were born in the same canton, while 177 or 13.8% were born somewhere else in Switzerland, and 96 or 7.5% were born outside of Switzerland.

As of 2011, children and teenagers (0–19 years old) make up 19.2% of the population, while adults (20–64 years old) make up 63.2% and seniors (over 64 years old) make up 17.6%.

As of 2000, there were 555 people who were single and never married in the municipality. There were 632 married individuals, 40 widows or widowers and 53 individuals who are divorced.

As of 2010, there were 157 households that consist of only one person and 34 households with five or more people. In 2000, a total of 489 apartments (92.6% of the total) were permanently occupied, while 31 apartments (5.9%) were seasonally occupied and 8 apartments (1.5%) were empty. As of 2010, the construction rate of new housing units was 7.1 new units per 1000 residents. The vacancy rate for the municipality, in 2012, was 1.66%.

The historical population is given in the following chart:

== Sights ==
Both hamlets of Riedbach and Wolei are designated as part of the Inventory of Swiss Heritage Sites.

== Politics ==
In the 2011 federal election the most popular party was the Swiss People's Party (SVP) which received 30% of the vote. The next three most popular parties were the Conservative Democratic Party (BDP) (22.7%), the Social Democratic Party (SP) (14%) and the Green Party (10.3%). In the federal election, a total of 541 votes were cast, and the voter turnout was 55.0%.

== Economy ==
As of 2011, Frauenkappelen had an unemployment rate of 0.91%. As of 2008, there were a total of 500 people employed in the municipality. Of these, there were 74 people employed in the primary economic sector and about 27 businesses involved in this sector. 275 people were employed in the secondary sector and there were 24 businesses in this sector. 151 people were employed in the tertiary sector, with 39 businesses in this sector. There were 723 residents of the municipality who were employed in some capacity, of which females made up 45.1% of the workforce.

In 2008 there were a total of 432 full-time equivalent jobs. The number of jobs in the primary sector was 44, all of which were in agriculture. The number of jobs in the secondary sector was 262 of which 131 or (50.0%) were in manufacturing and 130 (49.6%) were in construction. The number of jobs in the tertiary sector was 126. In the tertiary sector; 66 or 52.4% were in wholesale or retail sales or the repair of motor vehicles, 3 or 2.4% were in the movement and storage of goods, 11 or 8.7% were in a hotel or restaurant, 5 or 4.0% were in the information industry, 6 or 4.8% were the insurance or financial industry, 11 or 8.7% were technical professionals or scientists, 8 or 6.3% were in education and 2 or 1.6% were in health care.

In 2000, there were 277 workers who commuted into the municipality and 570 workers who commuted away. The municipality is a net exporter of workers, with about 2.1 workers leaving the municipality for every one entering. A total of 153 workers (35.6% of the 430 total workers in the municipality) both lived and worked in Frauenkappelen. About 1.2% of the locals commute out of Switzerland for work. Of the working population, 26% used public transportation to get to work, and 53.8% used a private car.

In 2011 the average local and cantonal tax rate on a married resident of Frauenkappelen making 150,000 CHF was 12.5%, while an unmarried resident's rate was 18.3%. For comparison, the average rate for the entire canton in 2006 was 13.9% and the nationwide rate was 11.6%. In 2009 there were a total of 594 tax payers in the municipality. Of that total, 241 made over 75,000 CHF per year. There were 6 people who made between 15,000 and 20,000 per year. The average income of the over 75,000 CHF group in Frauenkappelen was 131,658 CHF, while the average across all of Switzerland was 130,478 CHF.

== Religion ==
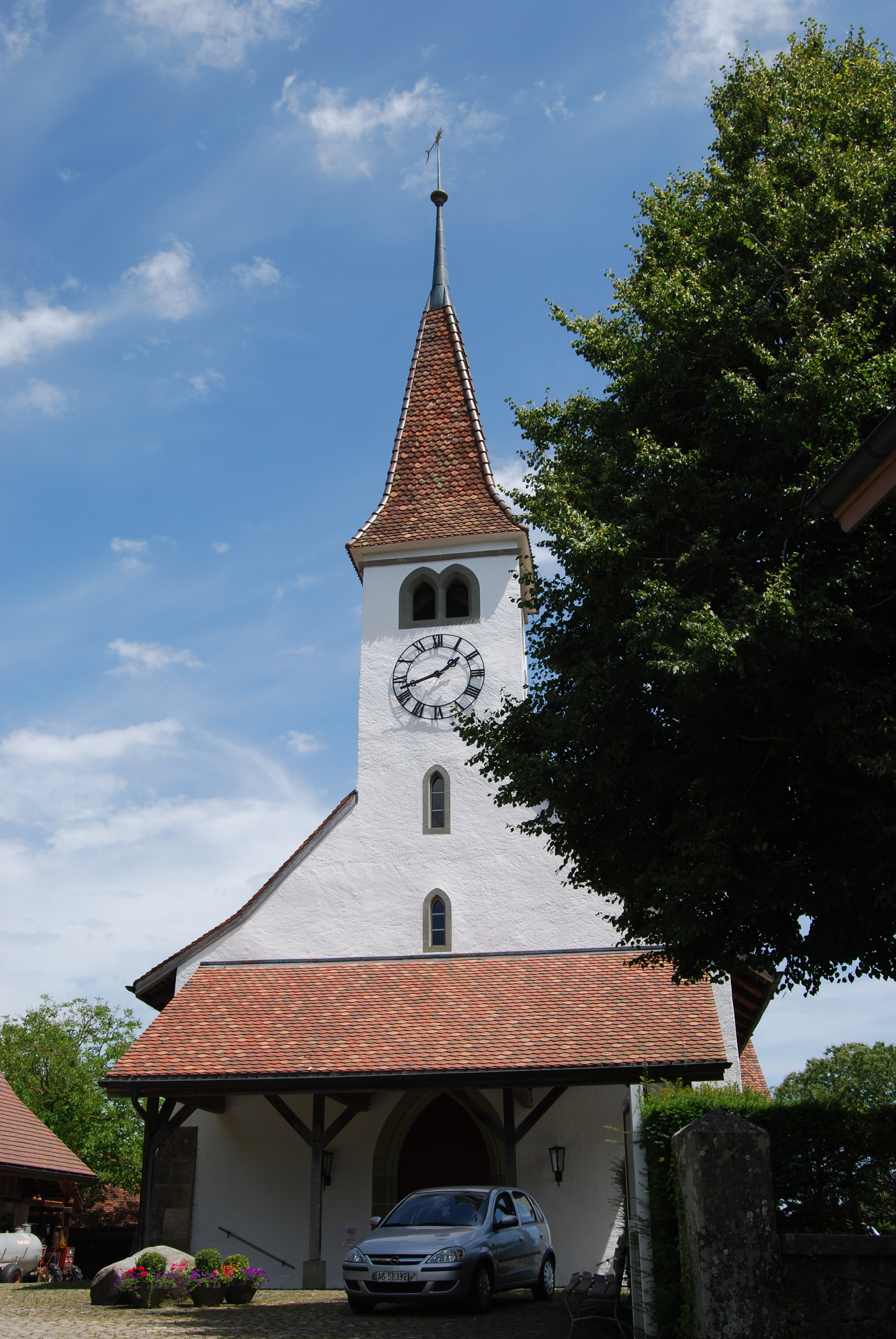
Frauenkappelen village church

From the 2000 census, 924 or 72.2% belonged to the Swiss Reformed Church, while 146 or 11.4% were Roman Catholic. Of the rest of the population, there were 7 members of an Orthodox church (or about 0.55% of the population), there was 1 individual who belongs to the Christian Catholic Church, and there were 108 individuals (or about 8.44% of the population) who belonged to another Christian church. There were 25 (or about 1.95% of the population) who were Islamic. There were 2 individuals who were Buddhist and 1 individual who belonged to another church. 78 (or about 6.09% of the population) belonged to no church, are agnostic or atheist, and 41 individuals (or about 3.20% of the population) did not answer the question.

== Education ==
In Frauenkappelen about 59% of the population have completed non-mandatory upper secondary education, and 24.5% have completed additional higher education (either university or a Fachhochschule). Of the 199 who had completed some form of tertiary schooling listed in the census, 75.9% were Swiss men, 18.6% were Swiss women, 4.0% were non-Swiss men.

The Canton of Bern school system provides one year of non-obligatory Kindergarten, followed by six years of Primary school. This is followed by three years of obligatory lower Secondary school where the students are separated according to ability and aptitude. Following the lower Secondary students may attend additional schooling or they may enter an apprenticeship.

During the 2011-12 school year, there were a total of 73 students attending classes in Frauenkappelen. There was one kindergarten class with a total of 14 students in the municipality. Of the kindergarten students, 7.1% were permanent or temporary residents of Switzerland (not citizens). The municipality had 3 primary classes and 59 students. Of the primary students, 6.8% were permanent or temporary residents of Switzerland (not citizens) and 3.4% have a different mother language than the classroom language.

As of 2000, there were a total of 114 students attending any school in the municipality. Of those, 111 both lived and attended school in the municipality, while 3 students came from another municipality. During the same year, 97 residents attended schools outside the municipality.
