= Brüggler family =

Extinct family of Bern, Switzerland

The Brüggler family was a family of the city of Bern that from the late 14th century was one of its leading non-noble families. It belonged to the Mittellöwen guild society from 1405 and became connected by marriage with the Diesbach family. Members of its first five generations held seats on the council and the offices of bailiff and banneret. Emperor Rudolf II granted the family a patent of nobility in 1587, and it died out in 1630.

== History ==
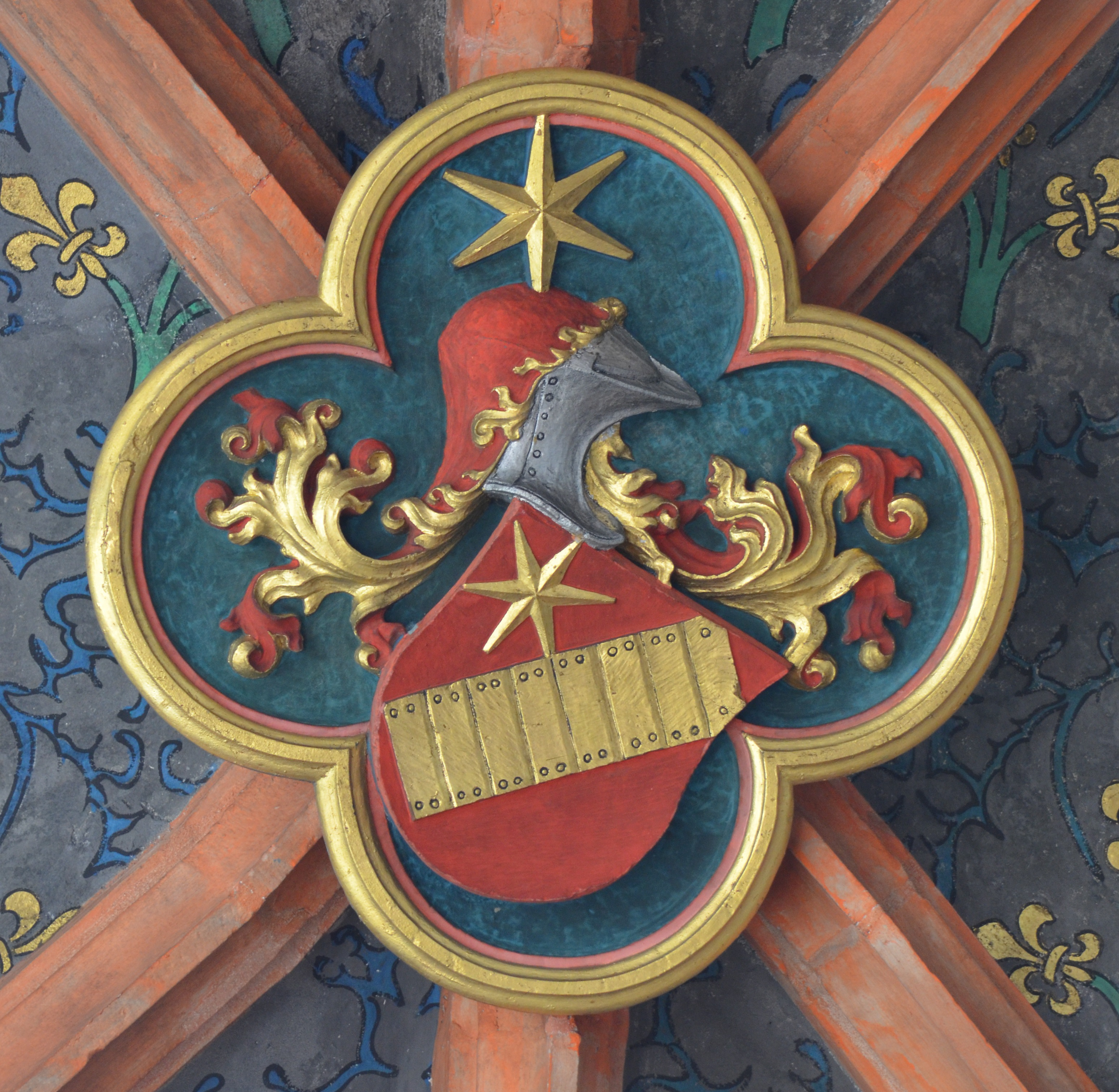
Keystone with the Brüggler arms in the Brüggler Chapel of Bern Minster

From 1405 the Brügglers were members of the Mittellöwen guild society (Gesellschaft zu Mittellöwen). Their growing wealth can be seen in the Tellbücher (tax registers) of 1389, 1448, and 1458. Through the marriage of Margaretha to Niklaus von Diesbach (died 1436), also called Clevi, the Brügglers became connected with one of the older noble families of Bern. Peter (died c. 1437), Niklaus von Diesbach's brother-in-law, was a long-distance merchant and later a partner in the Diesbach-Watt-Gesellschaft, working in places including Nuremberg and Eger in Bohemia.

His descendants increasingly entered the service of the city. Their social aspirations showed in donations for the Brüggler Chapel (St. Jodocus Chapel) and for the keystones in the vault of the south aisle of the collegiate church of St. Vincent. Peter (died 1469) and Ludwig were bannerets (Venner) of the tanners' society (Gesellschaft zu Gerbern) and styled themselves Junker, but in the Twingherrenstreit they were not counted among the Bernese nobility. Members of each of the first five generations held the offices of councilor, bailiff (Landvogt), and banneret. One branch died out in 1513 when Urban fell on the battlefield of Novara. In 1587 Emperor Rudolf II granted the family a patent of nobility.

From the second half of the 15th century, Sulpitius the Younger (died 1500) and his descendants became lords of Hindelbank and Mattstetten, partly through a marriage with Beatrix von Erlach. The second line acquired the lordship rights of Bremgarten through the marriage of Ludwig (1543–1602) to Salome Nägeli, a daughter of the Schultheiss Hans Franz Nägeli. Despite fairly numerous descendants, the family died out in 1630 with Christoph, a member of the Grand Council and owner of the Jennergut estate on the Gurten.

== Bibliography ==
- H. Ammann, Die Diesbach-Watt-Gesellschaft, 1928
- B. von Rodt, Genealogien burgerlicher Geschlechter der Stadt Bern, 1, 115–121 (manuscript, 1950, Burgerbibliothek Bern)
- U. M. Zahnd, Die autobiographischen Aufzeichnungen Ludwig von Diesbachs, 1986, especially 140–141

=== Archives ===
- Burgerbibliothek Bern
