= Laupen =

- Municipality
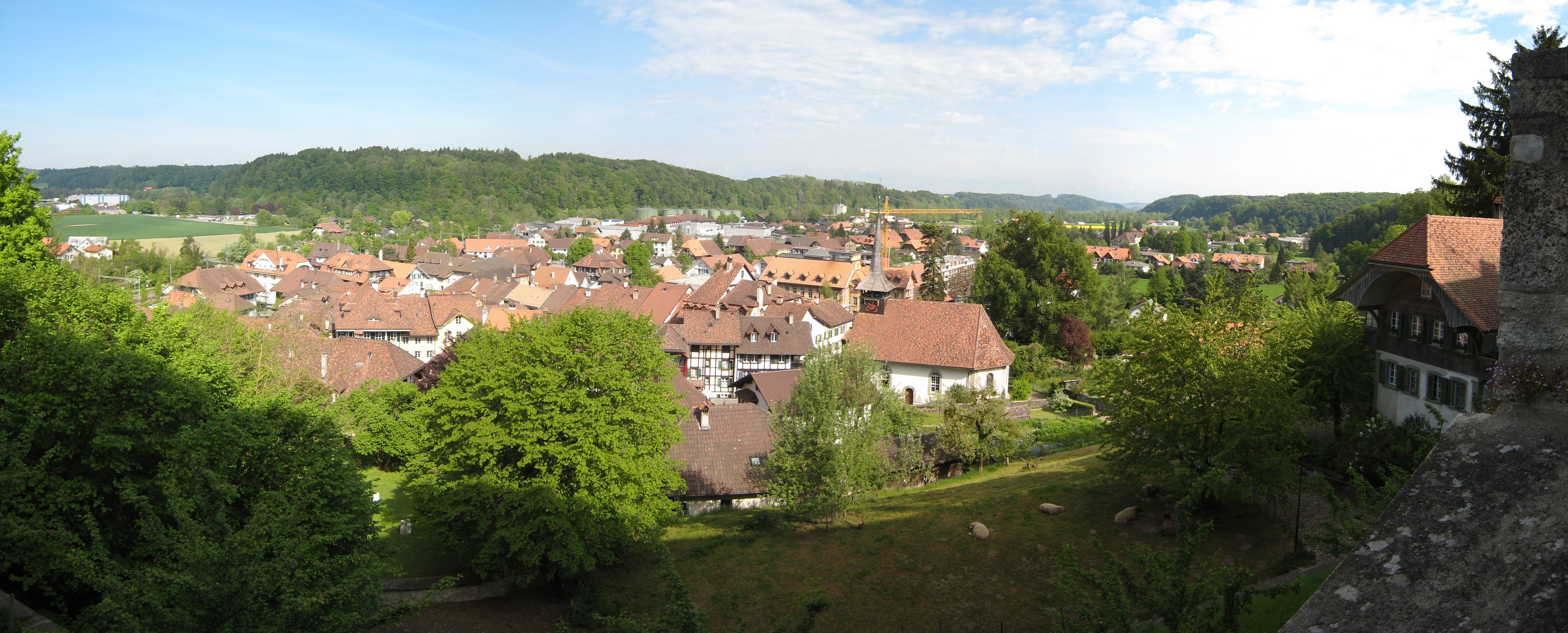

- Flag Coat of arms
- Location of Laupen
- Location within Switzerland Location within Canton of Bern
- Coordinates: 46°54′N 7°14′E
- Country: Switzerland
- Canton: Bern
- District: Laupen

Government
  - Executive: Gemeinderat with 7 members
  - Mayor: Gemeindepräsident(in); Bettina Schwab (as of 2026)

Area
  - Total: 4.12 km^{2} (1.59 sq mi)
- Elevation: 489 m (1,604 ft)

Population (December 2020)
  - Total: 3,230
  - Density: 784/km^{2} (2,030/sq mi)
- Time zone: UTC+01:00 (CET)
  - Summer (DST): UTC+02:00 (CEST)
- Postal code: 3177
- SFOS number: 667
- ISO 3166 code: CH-BE
- Surrounded by: Bösingen (FR), Ferenbalm, Gurmels (FR), Kriechenwil, Mühleberg, Neuenegg
- Website: www.laupen.ch

Laupen is a municipality in the Bern-Mittelland administrative district and its district capital, situated in the canton of Bern in Switzerland.

== History ==
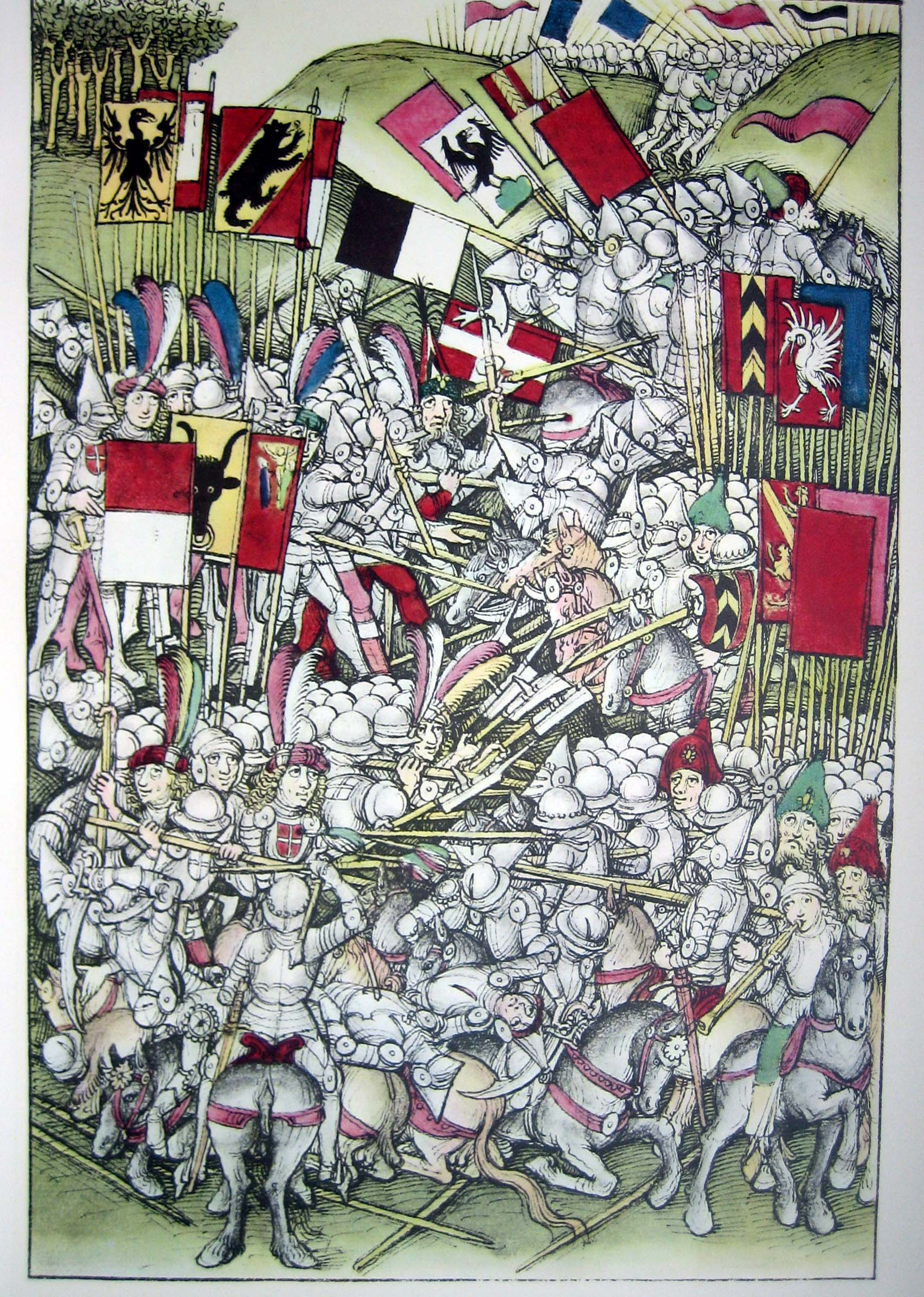
Battle of Laupen

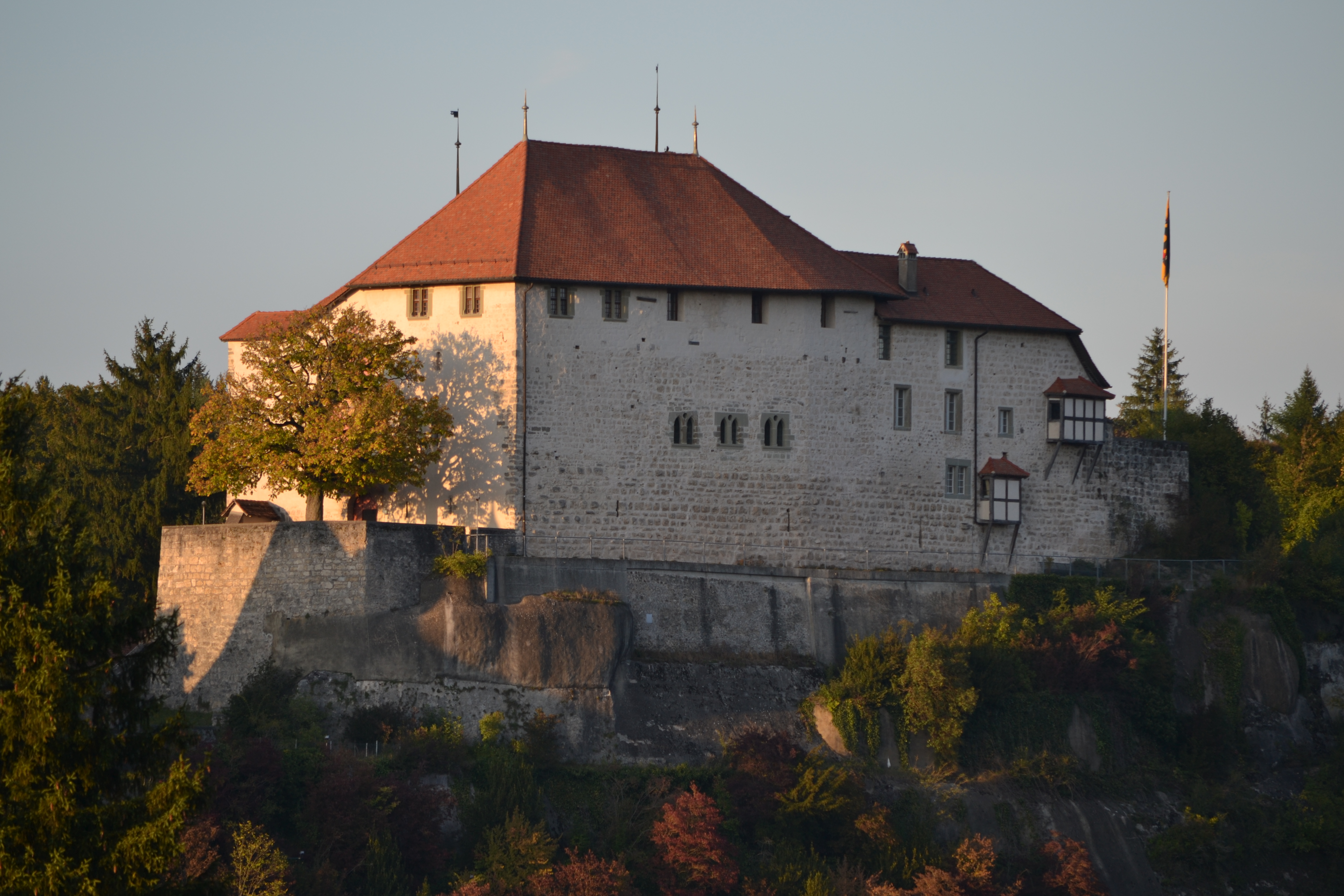
Laupen Castle

Laupen is first mentioned in 1130-33 as Loupa. In 1173 it was mentioned, in French, as Loyes. In 1352, it is recorded in Latin as Louppen.

It was the site of the Battle of Laupen in 1339. The Battle of Laupen was a decisive victory for Bern and its Swiss Confederation allies against the town of Fribourg. Laupen was one of a string of battles presaging the definite decline of High Medieval heavy cavalry (knights) in the face of improving infantry tactics during the following century and led to Bern joining the Swiss Confederation in 1353.

The oldest traces of settlements in Laupen is some Bronze Age sword blades which were found in a gravel pit and two grave mounds at Holzmatt-Laupenholz. Roman era coins, weapons and vessels were found north of Laupen town and at Zollgässli, while traces of a Roman road have been found at Laupenmühle. The remains of the supposed "Roman" Saane bridge 120 m (390 ft) downstream of the confluence of the Sense and Saane rivers Sarine have been recently dendrochronologically dated to the period around 1400.

Laupen Castle was built in the 10th-13th centuries as part of a line of imperial castles along the Sense and Saane rivers. The castle was built with a keep, main tower, and ring wall on a sandstone spur above the Sense river. Under the Second Kingdom of Burgundy, the castle was a residence of the kings. It then passed to the Dukes of Zähringen under whom it became the residence of a count. After the extinction of the Zähringen family it eventually was acquired by the Counts of Kyburg in 1253. The Kyburg main line died out in 1263 and the castle and surrounding lands became the center of a power struggle between the Habsburgs (the inheritors of the Kyburg lands) and the Counts of Savoy. The victorious Habsburgs appointed a castellan for Laupen Castle in 1269. The castellan was replaced by an imperial governor after 1300. In 1310 Emperor Henry VII pledged the castle and lands as collateral for a loan. In 1324, Bern acquired the pledged castle and lands. When the Emperor was unable to repay the loan, Laupen became the first bailiwick of Bern.

After Laupen became part of the Canton of Bern, the castle was the Bernese administrative headquarters. The castle stairway was expanded in 1580–99. The administrative offices in the castle were expanded in 1648-50 and it was totally renovated in 1983–88. During the 15th and 16th centuries, the bailiwick of Laupen expanded several times as Bern acquired more lands along the Sarine and Sense rivers. Until 1798 the castle was the official residence of bailiff of Laupen. The bailiwick of Laupen was reorganized into the Laupen District in 1803, which became part of the Bern-Mittelland District in 2010.

The town of Laupen was surrounded by its own city walls in the 13th Century. In 1275 King Rudolf I of Habsburg granted a town charter to Laupen, based on the charter of Bern. While the city was allied with Bern by 1301, it came under full Bernese control in 1324. The city authorities; mayor, town council and general assembly, were subordinate to the Bernese governor. Under the Ancien Régime, the 15-20 member council was appointed, by secret ballot, from members of the guilds. Laupen had a town seal in 1294 and a town flag in 1539. The town built a town hall around 1522 and a hospital in 1545.

Until the 15th Century Laupen was an important stage on the east–west road between Bern and Fribourg. As the Sarine and Sense rivers could only be forded at the low water, Bern built a bridge across the Sarine in 1324. The bridge was often destroyed in floods and after the construction of the Sense bridges at Gümmenen by Bern in 1450 and at Neuenegg by Fribourg in 1467, it was not rebuilt. The small bridge over the Sense at the town gate only served local traffic. Without convenient trade routes, the town remained stagnant. The poverty of the population and the resulting low construction activity helped to leave the old town almost untouched. This consists of two full rows of houses dating from the 16th and 17th centuries and a church around a triangular market plaza. After the partial demolition of the fortifications (1847–70) only parts of the curtain wall and the Freiburgtor (Fribourg gate), from the 15th century, remained. In 1784 Laupen had 42 town houses, some of which were in front of the wall.

In the last quarter of the 19th century the railroad and new roads led to an economic upswing. Today, service establishments (restaurants) and manufacturing (including printing, cardboard, computer, transportation companies and metal manufacturing) are the major employers. In 1997, the district government was reorganized and some district administration offices moved to other municipalities.

== Geography ==
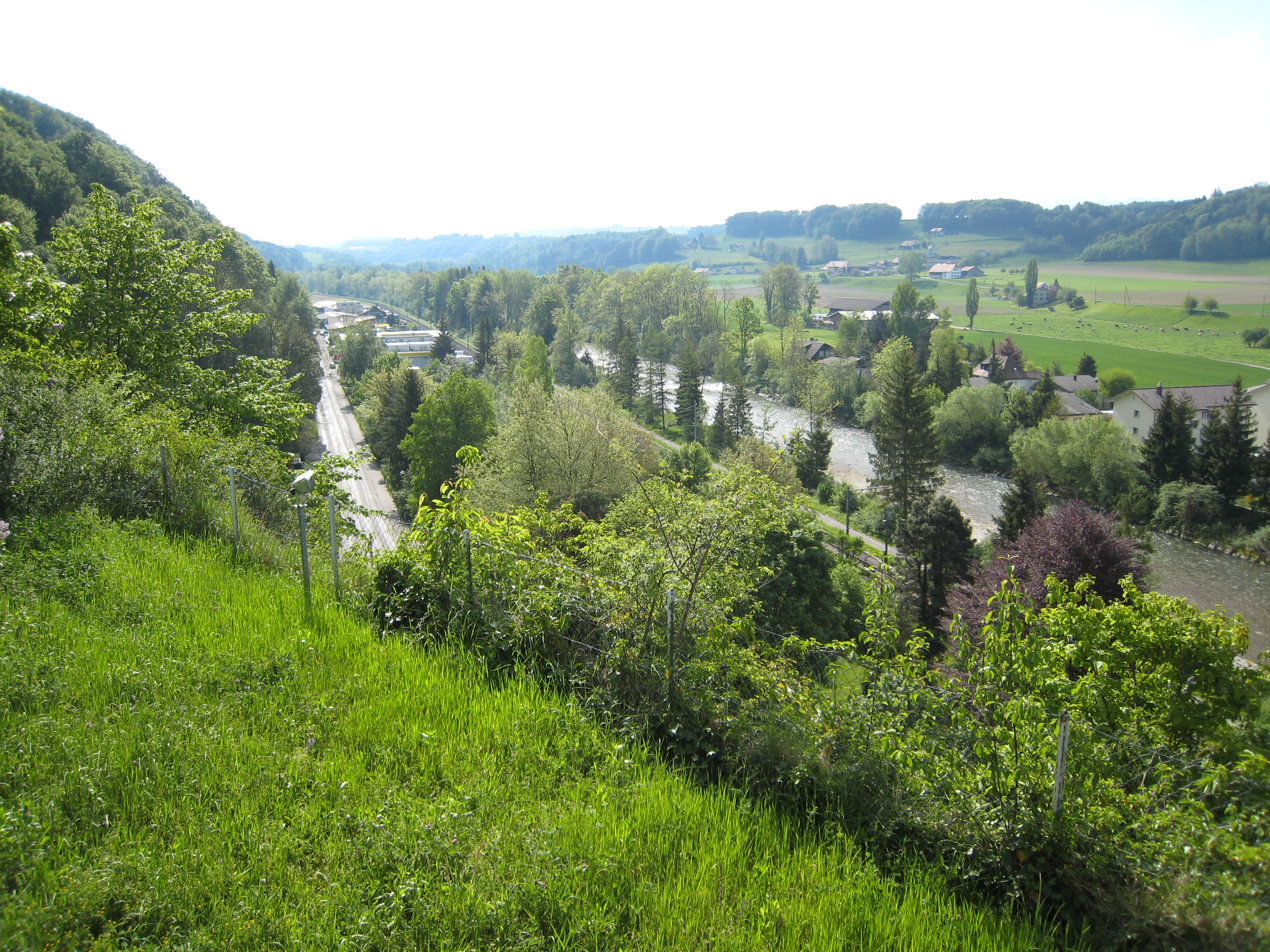
Sense river at Laupen

Aerial view by Walter Mittelholzer (1925)

Laupen has an area of 4.13 km^{2} (1.59 sq mi). Of this area, 1.59 km^{2} (0.61 mi^{2}) or 38.6% is used for agricultural purposes, while 1.23 km^{2} (0.47 mi^{2}) or 29.9% is forested. Of the rest of the land, 1.05 km^{2} (0.41 mi^{2}) or 25.5% is settled (buildings or roads), 0.21 km^{2} (0.081 mi^{2}) or 5.1% is either rivers or lakes.

Of the built up area, industrial buildings made up 2.9% of the total area while housing and buildings made up 13.8% and transportation infrastructure made up 4.6%. Power and water infrastructure as well as other special developed areas made up 1.7% of the area while parks, green belts and sports fields made up 2.4%. Out of the forested land, 26.7% of the total land area is heavily forested and 3.2% is covered with orchards or small clusters of trees. Of the agricultural land, 30.6% is used for growing crops and 7.8% is pastures. All the water in the municipality is flowing water.

It is located on the right bank of the Sense River near where the river enters the Saane River.

== Coat of arms ==
The blazon of the municipal coat of arms is Argent a Linden Tree eradicated Vert with seven leaves.

== Demographics ==
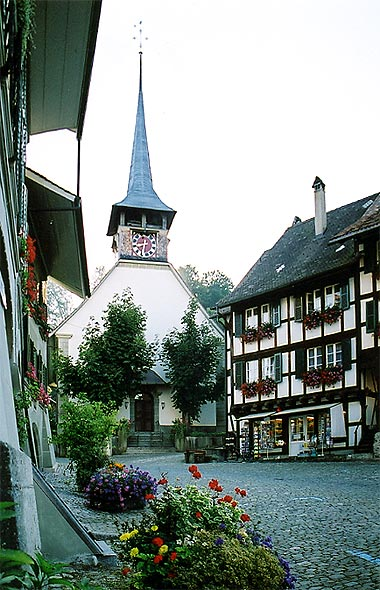
Church and old town of Laupen

Laupen has a population (as of December 2020) of 3,230. As of 2010, 10.0% of the population are resident foreign nationals. Over the last 10 years (2000–2010) the population has changed at a rate of 0.7%. Migration accounted for 0.2%, while births and deaths accounted for 1.4%.

Most of the population (as of 2000) speaks German (2,581 or 92.3%) as their first language, Italian is the second most common (43 or 1.5%) and French is the third (42 or 1.5%). There is 1 person who speaks Romansh.

As of 2008, the population was 49.0% male and 51.0% female. The population was made up of 1,235 Swiss men (43.9% of the population) and 142 (5.0%) non-Swiss men. There were 1,296 Swiss women (46.1%) and 140 (5.0%) non-Swiss women. Of the population in the municipality, 591 or about 21.1% were born in Laupen and lived there in 2000. There were 1,222 or 43.7% who were born in the same canton, while 623 or 22.3% were born somewhere else in Switzerland, and 284 or 10.2% were born outside of Switzerland.

As of 2000, children and teenagers (0–19 years old) make up 23.6% of the population, while adults (20–64 years old) make up 61% and seniors (over 64 years old) make up 15.4%.

As of 2000, there were 1,121 people who were single and never married in the municipality. There were 1,347 married individuals, 196 widows or widowers and 132 individuals who are divorced.

As of 2000, there were 1,188 private households in the municipality, and an average of 2.3 persons per household. There were 383 households that consist of only one person and 71 households with five or more people. In 2000, a total of 1,154 apartments (90.4% of the total) were permanently occupied, while 65 apartments (5.1%) were seasonally occupied and 58 apartments (4.5%) were empty. As of 2009, the construction rate of new housing units was 10 new units per 1000 residents. The vacancy rate for the municipality, in 2010, was 1.4%.

The historical population is given in the following chart:

== Heritage sites of national significance ==
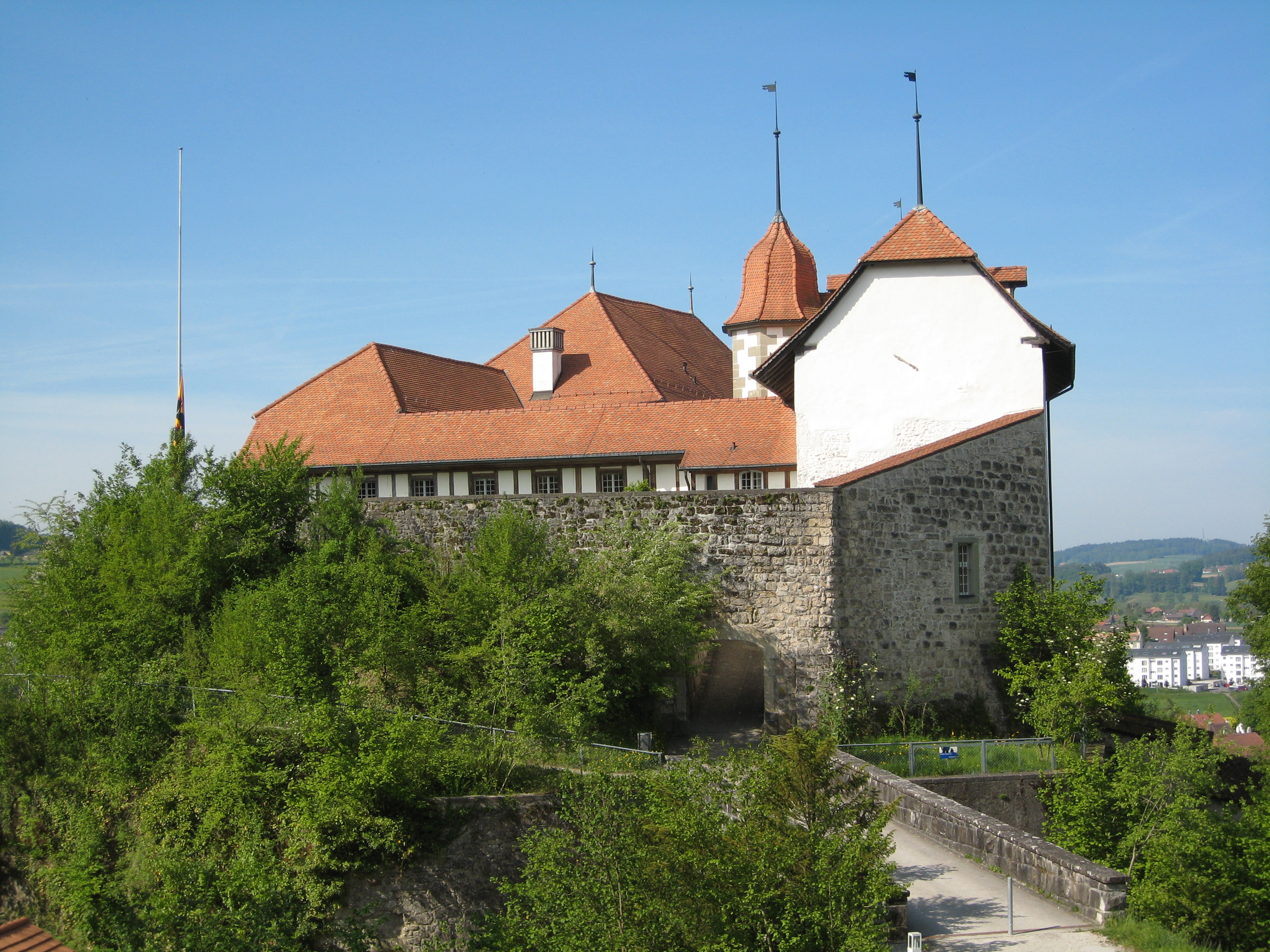
Laupen Castle.

Laupen Castle is listed as a Swiss heritage site of national significance. The entire town of Laupen is part of the Inventory of Swiss Heritage Sites.

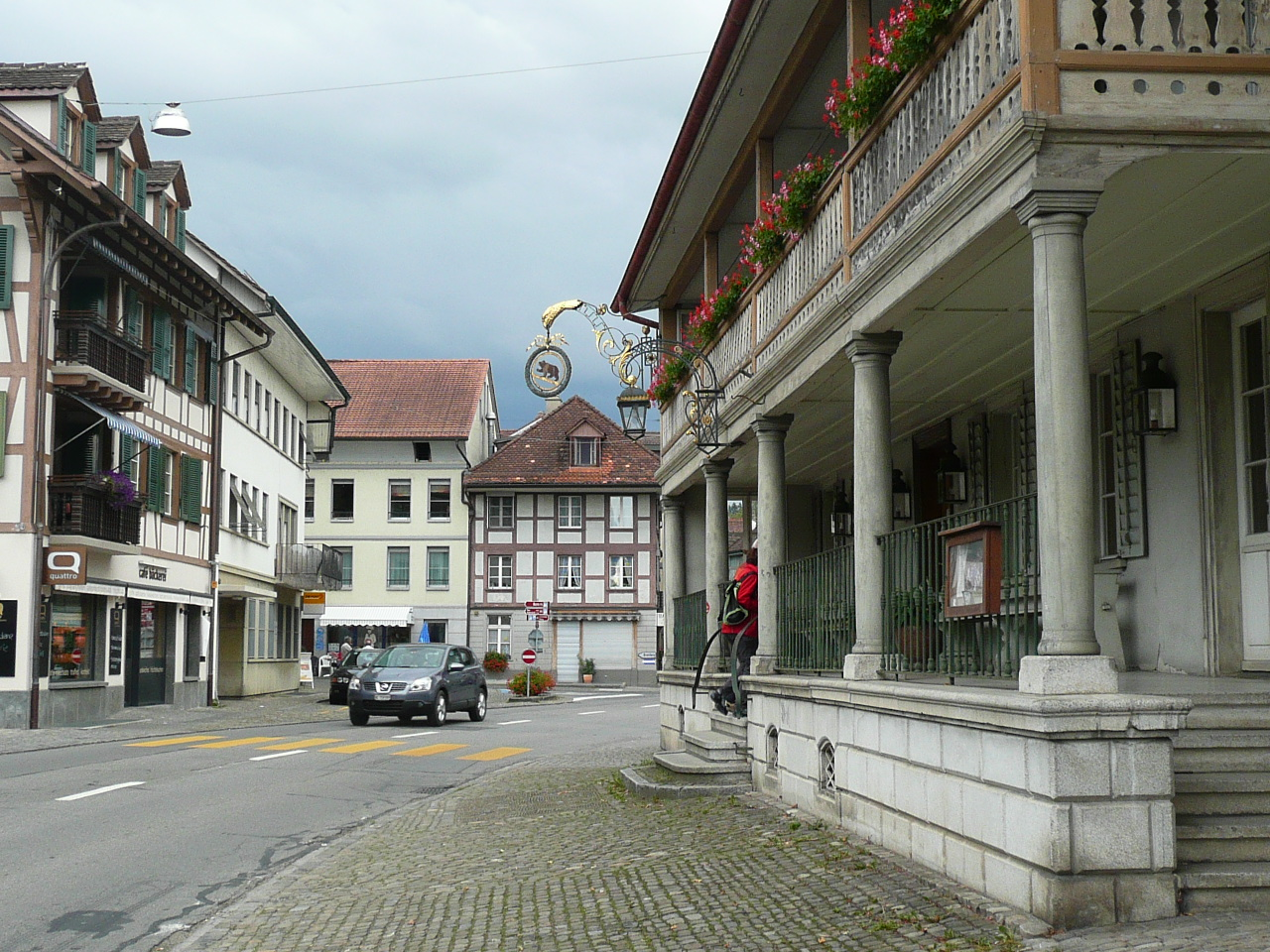
Gasthof Bären

== Politics ==
In the 2007 federal election the most popular party was the SVP which received 30.34% of the vote. The next three most popular parties were the SPS (24.28%), the FDP (18.24%) and the Green Party (11.54%). In the federal election, a total of 975 votes were cast, and the voter turnout was 47.2%.

== Economy ==
As of 2010, Laupen had an unemployment rate of 2.8%. As of 2008, there were 13 people employed in the primary economic sector and about 5 businesses involved in this sector. 205 people were employed in the secondary sector and there were 25 businesses in this sector. 837 people were employed in the tertiary sector, with 117 businesses in this sector.

In 2008 the total number of full-time equivalent jobs was 788. The number of jobs in the primary sector was 11, all of which were in agriculture. The number of jobs in the secondary sector was 175 of which 103 or (58.9%) were in manufacturing and 65 (37.1%) were in construction. The number of jobs in the tertiary sector was 602. In the tertiary sector; 171 or 28.4% were in wholesale or retail sales or the repair of motor vehicles, 32 or 5.3% were in the movement and storage of goods, 38 or 6.3% were in a hotel or restaurant, 4 or 0.7% were in the information industry, 24 or 4.0% were the insurance or financial industry, 69 or 11.5% were technical professionals or scientists, 24 or 4.0% were in education and 189 or 31.4% were in health care.

In 2000, there were 818 workers who commuted into the municipality and 994 workers who commuted away. The municipality is a net exporter of workers, with about 1.2 workers leaving the municipality for every one entering. Of the working population, 23.8% used public transportation to get to work, and 47.9% used a private car.

== Transport ==
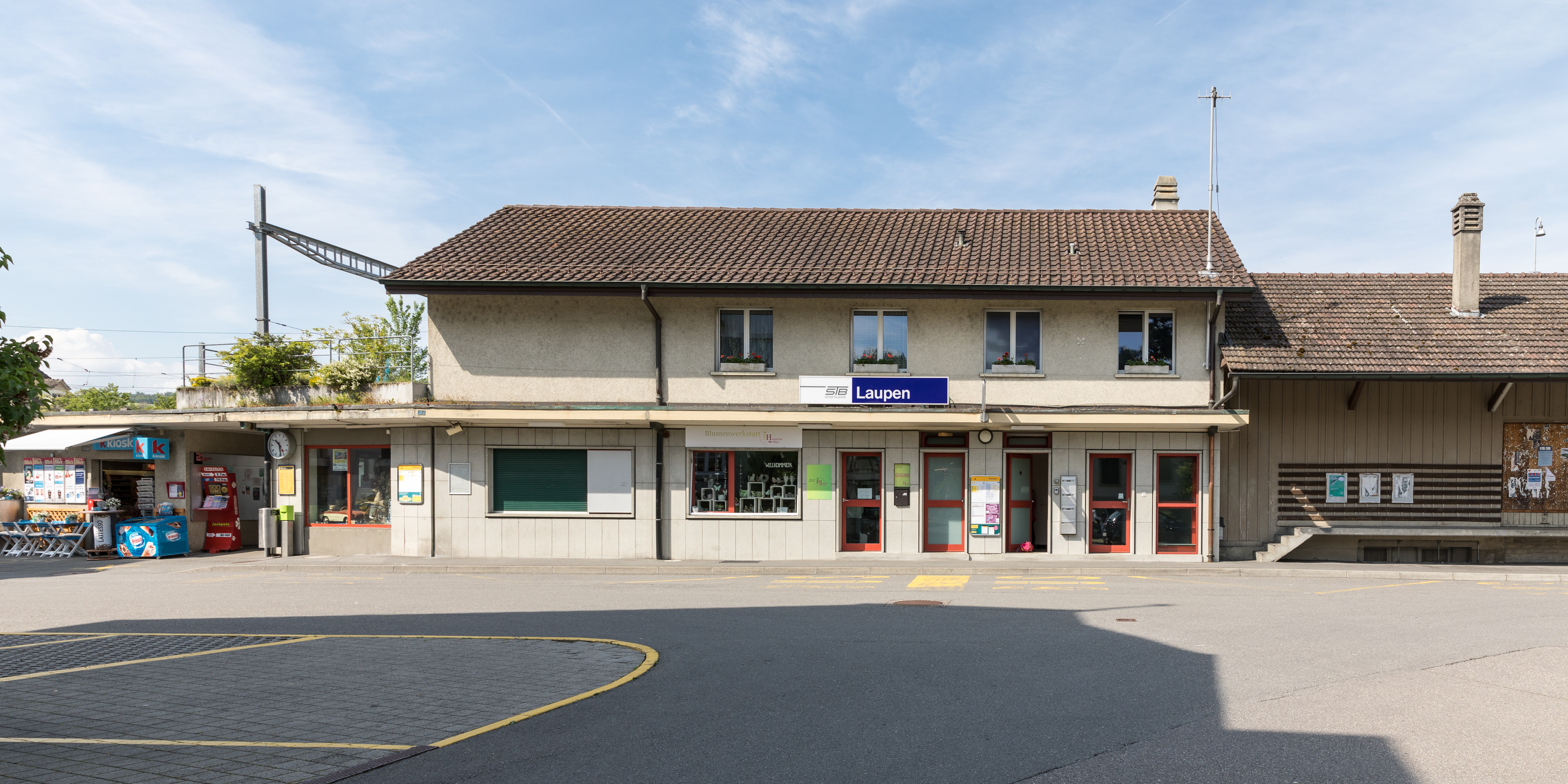
The Laupen station in 2019, prior to reconstruction

Laupen has a railway station, Laupen BE, on the Flamatt–Laupen line.

== Religion ==
From the 2000 census, 510 or 18.2% were Roman Catholic, while 1,879 or 67.2% belonged to the Swiss Reformed Church. Of the rest of the population, there were 12 members of an Orthodox church (or about 0.43% of the population), there were 6 individuals (or about 0.21% of the population) who belonged to the Christian Catholic Church, and there were 96 individuals (or about 3.43% of the population) who belonged to another Christian church. There was 1 individual who was Jewish, and 72 (or about 2.58% of the population) who were Islamic. There were 10 individuals who were Buddhist and 21 individuals who were Hindu. 189 (or about 6.76% of the population) belonged to no church, are agnostic or atheist, and 46 individuals (or about 1.65% of the population) did not answer the question.

== Weather ==
Laupen has an average of 126.4 days of rain or snow per year and on average receives 1,002 mm (39.4 in) of precipitation. The wettest month is June during which time Laupen receives an average of 111 mm (4.4 in) of rain or snow. During this month there is precipitation for an average of 11.4 days. The month with the most days of precipitation is May, with an average of 13.1, but with only 99 mm (3.9 in) of rain or snow. The driest month of the year is February with an average of 62 mm (2.4 in) of precipitation over 10.3 days.

== Education ==
In Laupen about 1,173 or (42.0%) of the population have completed non-mandatory upper secondary education, and 369 or (13.2%) have completed additional higher education (either university or a Fachhochschule). Of the 369 who completed tertiary schooling, 73.7% were Swiss men, 22.5% were Swiss women, 3.0% were non-Swiss men.

The Canton of Bern school system provides one year of non-obligatory Kindergarten, followed by six years of Primary school. This is followed by three years of obligatory lower Secondary school where the students are separated according to ability and aptitude. Following the lower Secondary students may attend additional schooling or they may enter an apprenticeship.

During the 2009–10 school year, there were a total of 326 students attending classes in Laupen. There were 3 kindergarten classes with a total of 49 students in the municipality. Of the kindergarten students, 12.2% were permanent or temporary residents of Switzerland (not citizens) and 20.4% have a different mother language than the classroom language. The municipality had 9 primary classes and 171 students. Of the primary students, 13.0% were permanent or temporary residents of Switzerland (not citizens) and 13.6% have a different mother language than the classroom language. During the same year, there were 6 lower secondary classes with a total of 115 students. There were 7.0% who were permanent or temporary residents of Switzerland (not citizens) and 5.2% have a different mother language than the classroom language.

As of 2000, there were 65 students in Laupen who came from another municipality, while 69 residents attended schools outside the municipality.

Laupen is home to 2 libraries; the Schul- und Gemeindebibliothek Laupen and the Bibliothek Laupen. There was a combined total (as of 2008) of 15,224 books or other media in the libraries, and in the same year a total of 28,964 items were loaned out.

== Notable people ==
- Ernst Wilczek (1867 in Laupen – 1948) – Swiss botanist and pharmacist
