= Sense (river) =

River in Switzerland

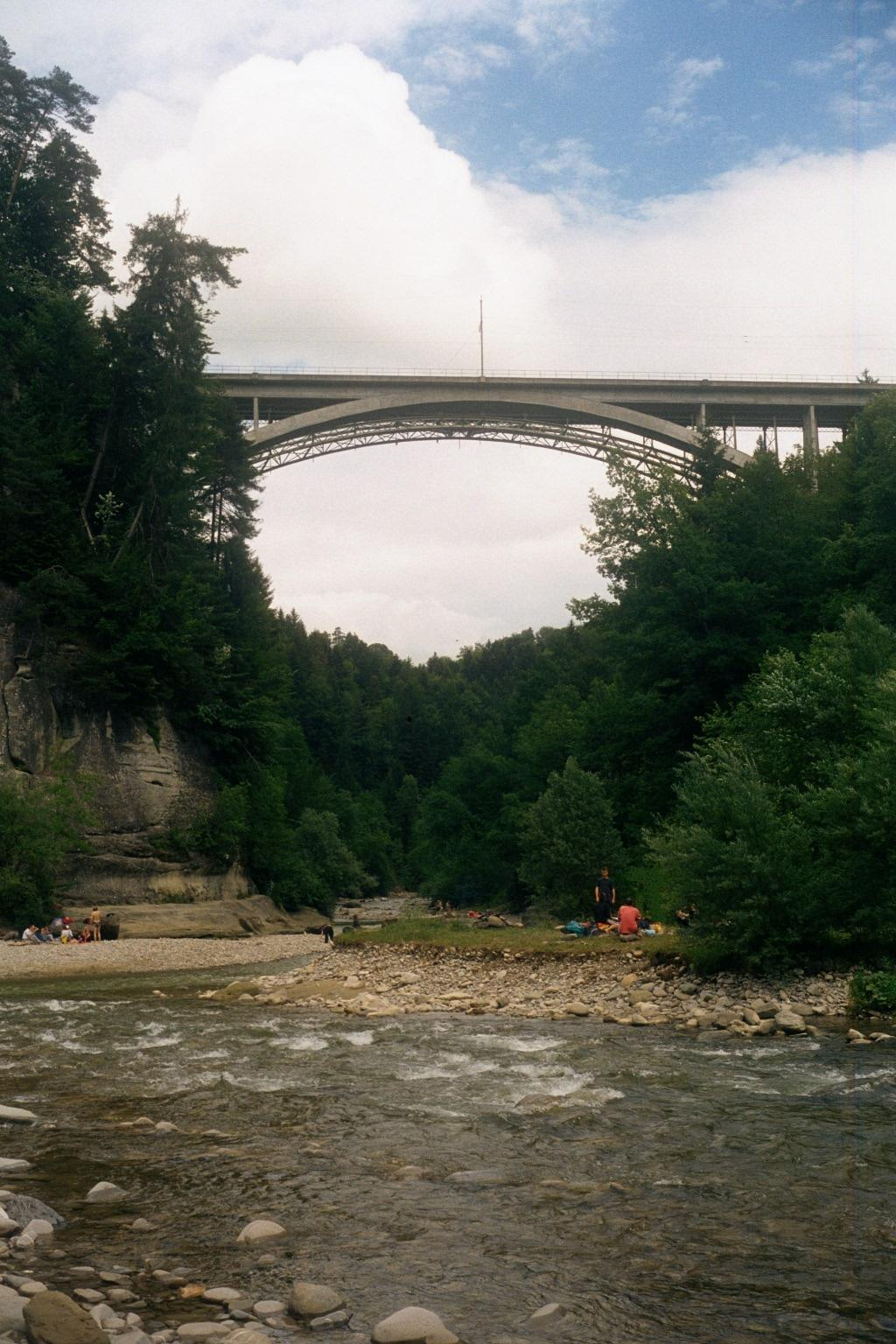
- The River Sense at the Schwarzwasser junction

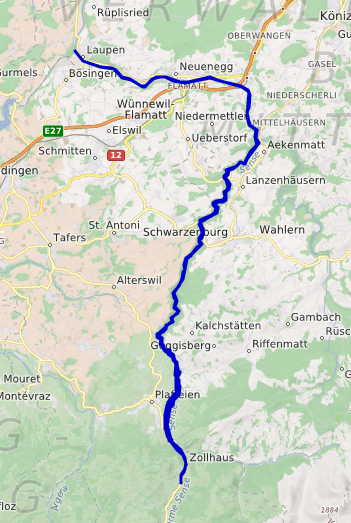
- Native name: Singine (French); Singena (Arpitan)

Location
- Country: Switzerland

Physical characteristics
- Source
  - location: Confluence of Kalte Sense and Warme Sense at Zollhaus
- Mouth: Into the river Saane at Laupen
  - coordinates: 46°54′21″N 7°14′02″E
  - elevation: 489 metres (1,604 ft)
- Length: 35.7 km (22.2 mi)

Basin features
- Progression: Saane→ Aare→ Rhine→ North Sea

The river Sense (German: Sense; French: Singine; Arpitan: Singena, locally Chindzena [ʃɛ̃ˈdzəna]) is a right tributary of the river Saane in Switzerland.

== Geography ==
It is a border river between the Cantons of Fribourg and Bern. Its source rivers, the Kalte Sense, coming from Mount Gantrisch, and Warme Sense, flowing out of lake Schwarzsee, join at Zollhaus and thus form the origin of the Sense.

The Sense flows through a gorge of 15 km length, which is popular for whitewater sports, but also for swimming and bathing – especially among nudists. Its main tributary is the river Schwarzwasser.

After about 35 km, the Sense joins the Saane river at Laupen. Because the Sense's water level can rise rapidly during hefty rainstorms, it is dangerous to stay near the river bed in uncertain weather conditions.

== See also ==
- List of rivers of Switzerland
