= Münchenwiler =

- Municipality
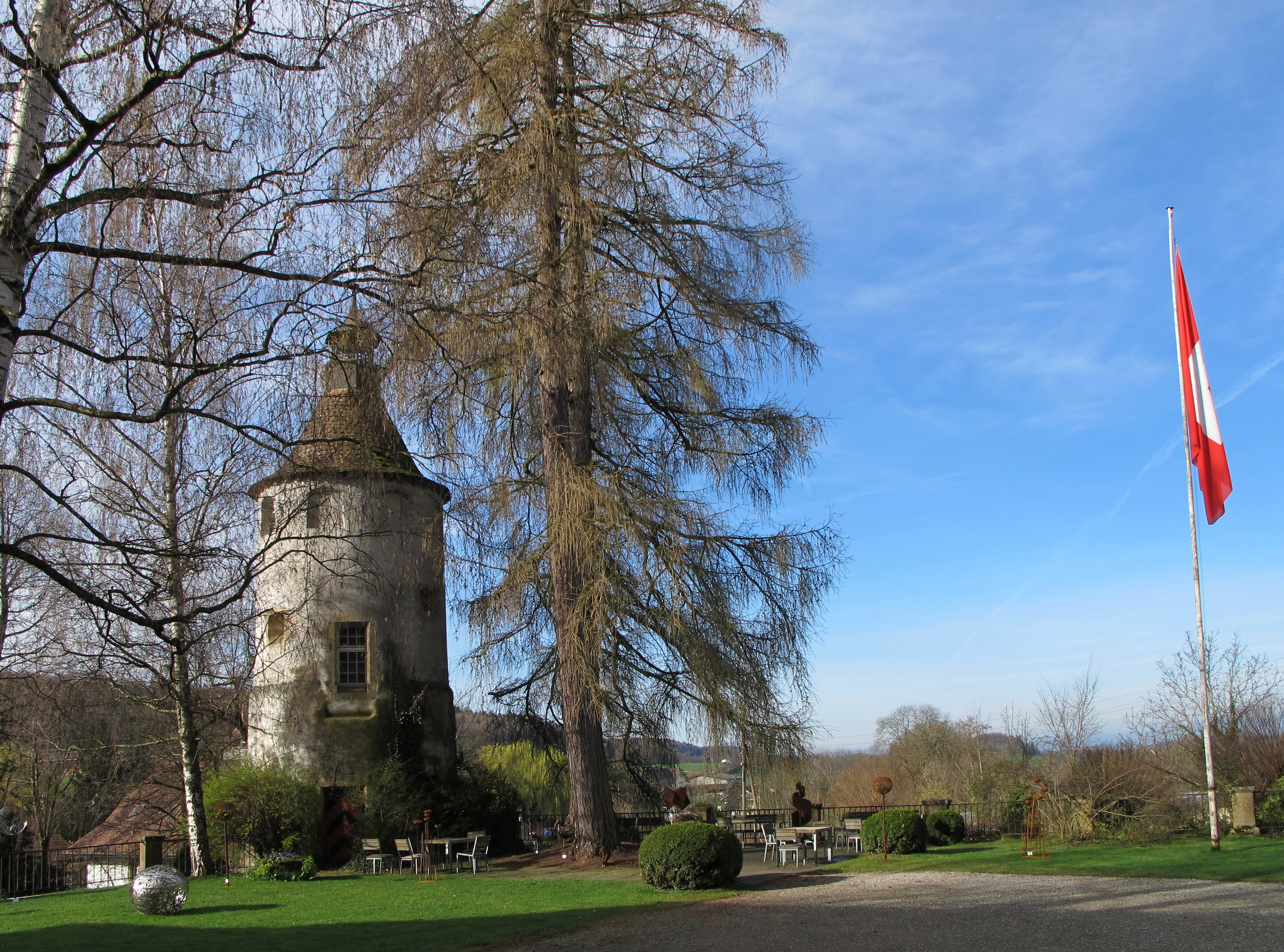

- Flag Coat of arms
- Location of Münchenwiler
- Location within Switzerland Location within Canton of Bern
- Coordinates: 46°55′N 7°07′E
- Country: Switzerland
- Canton: Bern
- District: Bern-Mittelland

Government
  - Executive: Gemeinderat with 5 members
  - Mayor: Gemeindepräsident(in); Jürg Brönnimann (as of 2026)

Area
  - Total: 2.5 km^{2} (0.97 sq mi)
- Elevation: 508 m (1,667 ft)

Population (December 2020)
  - Total: 518
  - Density: 210/km^{2} (540/sq mi)
- Time zone: UTC+01:00 (CET)
  - Summer (DST): UTC+02:00 (CEST)
- Postal code: 1797
- SFOS number: 669
- ISO 3166 code: CH-BE
- Surrounded by: Courgevaux (FR), Courlevon (FR), Cressier (FR), Murten/Morat (FR), Salvenach (FR)
- Website: https://www.muenchenwiler.ch SFSO statistics

Münchenwiler (French: Villars-Les-Moines) is a municipality in the Bern-Mittelland administrative district in the canton of Bern in Switzerland.

== History ==
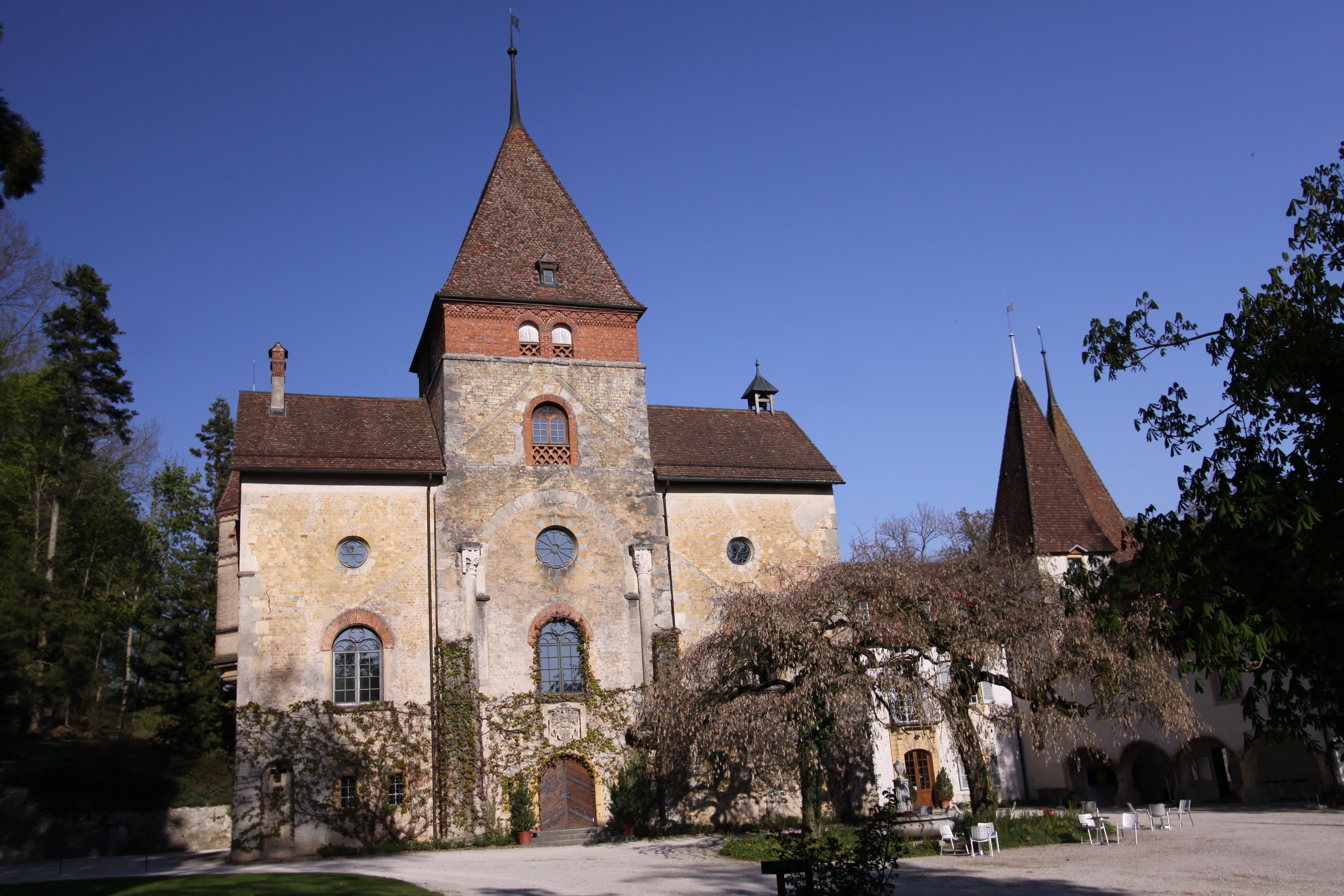
Münchenwiler Castle

Münchenwiler is first mentioned in 1080-81 as Vilar. In 1228 it was mentioned as Vilar les Moinos.

In 1080-81 the village was given by the brothers Gerold and Rudolf de Vilar to Cluny Abbey. Shortly thereafter a priory was founded, which served as a way station for pilgrims on the Way of St. James. The Priory church was built in 1100, using spolia from the Roman ruins at Avenches. The small priory community normally consisted of a prior and two to four monks. The priory suffered during the local wars of the 14th and 15th centuries. It was damaged during the Battle of Laupen in 1339. Over a century later, in 1448, it was damaged again during the Freiburgkrieg between the emergent city-states of Bern and Fribourg. In 1476 it was damaged a third time during the Burgundian Wars. During the 15th century, the small priory began to lose importance until the office of prior was reduced to a title without power. In 1484, by papal decree, leadership of the priory was transferred to the college of canons of the Munster of Bern. In 1528, Bern adopted the Protestant Reformation. Despite resistance from Fribourg, in 1530 Bern was able to retain control and secularize Münchenwiler.

A village developed outside the walls of the Priory to support the farmers that worked the ecclesiastical fields. A tavern and a mill were built by the Priory and operated as a fief under the Prior. By 1436 it had a communal bakery and a school house. Originally, the villagers attended church in the Priory chapel, but after the Bernese college of canons took over, the residents joined the parish of Morat. Even after Bern adopted the new faith of the Protestant Reformation and spread it to Münchenwiler they remained part of the Murten parish.

In 1535 Bern sold the Herrschaft of Münchenwiler to the former Bernese Schultheiss Hans Jakob von Wattenwyl. Over the next two years, under von Wattenwyl, portions of the priory church and priory buildings were converted into a castle. It remained with the von Wattenwyl family until 1612. For the next fifty years it passed through several owners, before the von Graffenried family acquired it in 1668 and held it until 1932. The castle was expanded in 1690 and again in the 19th century. A new chapel was added to the castle in 1886. The von Graffenried family became impoverished in the early 20th century and in 1922 they began to sell some of their property in the area. In 1932 they sold the castle and its remaining park land to a consortium from Neuchâtel. In 1943 the consortium sold it to the Canton of Bern, who converted it into a community Hochschule. Later it became an adult education school before being renovated and converted into a hotel and convention center in 1986–90.

Originally the village had been French speaking, but after it was brought under Bernese control it became a German-speaking village. Beginning in 1738, the village school taught lessons in German. Following the 1798 French invasion, Münchenwiler became part of the Helvetic Republic in the short lived Canton of Sarine et Broye. Under the new Republic, the castle's lands were transferred to the municipality. With the collapse of the Helvetic Republic and the Act of Mediation in 1803, Münchenwiler was assigned to the French-speaking Canton of Fribourg. Four years later, through political maneuvering, the Canton of Bern was able to bring the municipality back under its control. In 1898, the Fribourg-Morat-Ins railroad built a station at Münchenwiler-Courgevaux (in Fribourg) which connected the two communities to the Swiss rail network.

In 1895 and again in 2008 attempts by the Canton to merge the two exclaves of Clavaleyres and Münchenwiler failed due to opposition from the residents.

== Geography ==
Münchenwiler has an area of 2.48 km^{2} (0.96 sq mi). As of 2012, a total of 1.63 km^{2} (0.63 mi^{2}) or 65.2% is used for agricultural purposes, while 0.52 km^{2} (0.20 mi^{2}) or 20.8% is forested. Of the rest of the land, 0.29 km^{2} (0.11 mi^{2}) or 11.6% is settled (buildings or roads), 0.02 km^{2} (4.9 acres) or 0.8% is either rivers or lakes and 0.01 km^{2} (2.5 acres) or 0.4% is unproductive land.

During the same year, housing and buildings made up 7.6% and transportation infrastructure made up 3.6%. Out of the forested land, 19.6% of the total land area is heavily forested and 1.2% is covered with orchards or small clusters of trees. Of the agricultural land, 40.8% is used for growing crops and 20.0% is pastures, while 4.4% is used for orchards or vine crops. All the water in the municipality is flowing water.

Located on the southern shore of Lake Morat, it forms a Bernese exclave within the canton of Fribourg. The municipality lies on the Fribourg–Morat railway line and the N1 motorway crosses it in a tunnel.

On 31 December 2009 Amtsbezirk Laupen, the municipality's former district, was dissolved. On the following day, 1 January 2010, it joined the newly created Verwaltungskreis Bern-Mittelland.

== Coat of arms ==
The blazon of the municipal coat of arms is Argent a Monk proper holding a Linden tree Vert. The monk (German: Mönch) makes the coat of arms partly an example of canting arms.

== Demographics ==
Münchenwiler has a population (as of December 2020) of 518. As of 2010, 11.0% of the population are resident foreign nationals. Over the last 10 years (2001-2011) the population has changed at a rate of 1.7%. Migration accounted for -0.4%, while births and deaths accounted for 0.4%.

Most of the population (as of 2000) speaks German (398 or 91.7%) as their first language, French is the second most common (21 or 4.8%) and Italian is the third (3 or 0.7%). There are 2 people who speak Romansh.

As of 2008, the population was 51.3% male and 48.7% female. The population was made up of 209 Swiss men (45.2% of the population) and 28 (6.1%) non-Swiss men. There were 202 Swiss women (43.7%) and 23 (5.0%) non-Swiss women. Of the population in the municipality, 114 or about 26.3% were born in Münchenwiler and lived there in 2000. There were 133 or 30.6% who were born in the same canton, while 142 or 32.7% were born somewhere else in Switzerland, and 27 or 6.2% were born outside of Switzerland.

As of 2011, children and teenagers (0–19 years old) make up 19.1% of the population, while adults (20–64 years old) make up 66.4% and seniors (over 64 years old) make up 14.5%.

As of 2000, there were 193 people who were single and never married in the municipality. There were 207 married individuals, 17 widows or widowers and 17 individuals who are divorced.

As of 2010, there were 44 households that consist of only one person and 14 households with five or more people. In 2000, a total of 163 apartments (90.1% of the total) were permanently occupied, while 15 apartments (8.3%) were seasonally occupied and 3 apartments (1.7%) were empty. As of 2010, the construction rate of new housing units was 19.5 new units per 1000 residents. The vacancy rate for the municipality, in 2012, was 0.45%.

The historical population is given in the following chart:

== Heritage sites of national significance ==
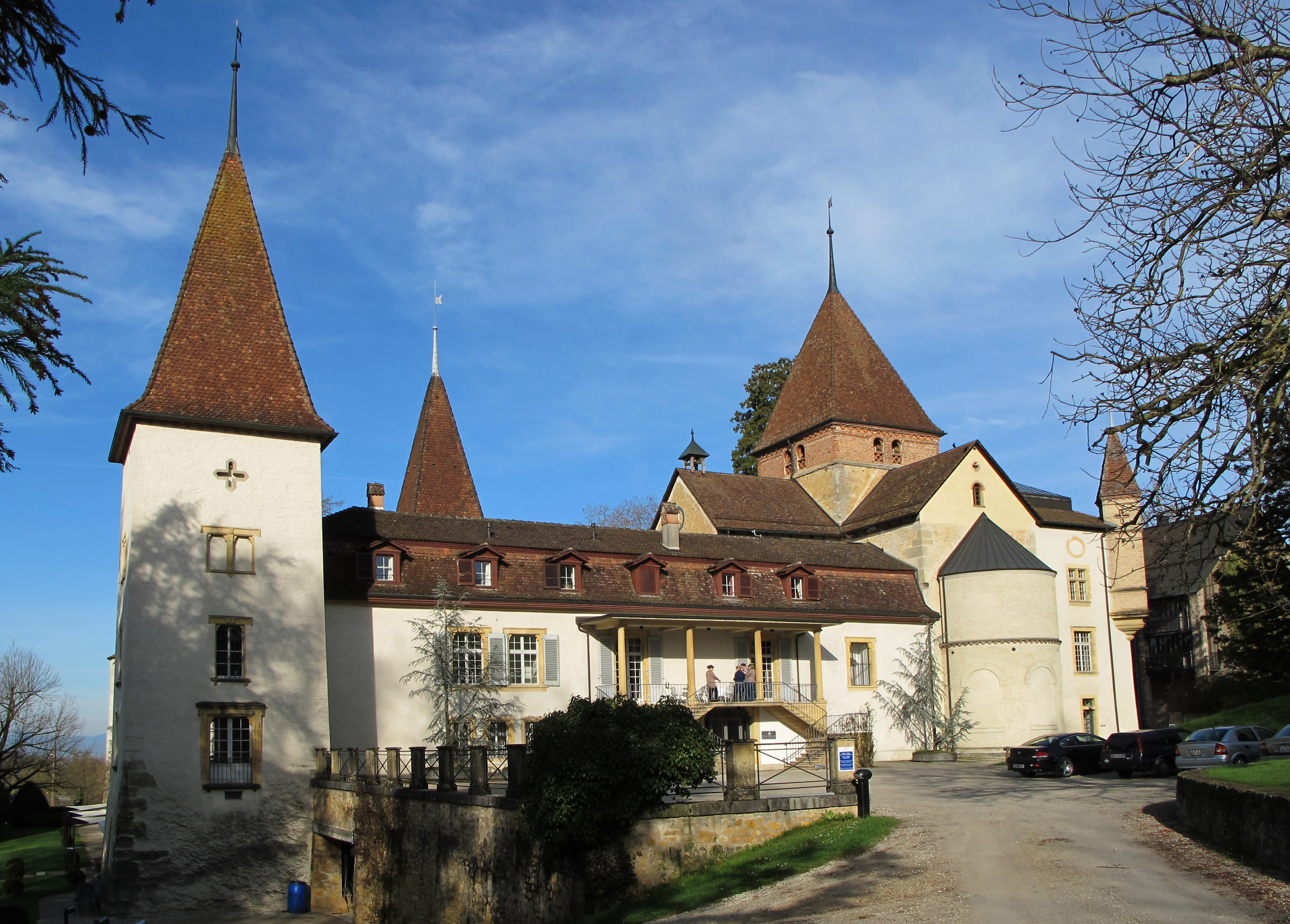
Münchenwiler Castle

The Castle with its park is listed as a Swiss heritage site of national significance. The entire village of Münchenwiler is part of the Inventory of Swiss Heritage Sites.

== Politics ==
In the 2011 federal election the most popular party was the Swiss People's Party (SVP) which received 36.9% of the vote. The next three most popular parties were the Conservative Democratic Party (BDP) (16.8%), the Social Democratic Party (SP) (14%) and the FDP.The Liberals (10.2%). In the federal election, a total of 177 votes were cast, and the voter turnout was 45.9%.

== Economy ==
As of 2011, Münchenwiler had an unemployment rate of 1.3%. As of 2008, there were a total of 160 people employed in the municipality. Of these, there were 30 people employed in the primary economic sector and about 10 businesses involved in this sector. 74 people were employed in the secondary sector and there were 9 businesses in this sector. 56 people were employed in the tertiary sector, with 11 businesses in this sector. There were 229 residents of the municipality who were employed in some capacity, of which females made up 41.5% of the workforce.

In 2008 there were a total of 133 full-time equivalent jobs. The number of jobs in the primary sector was 22, all of which were in agriculture. The number of jobs in the secondary sector was 62 of which 12 or (19.4%) were in manufacturing and 15 (24.2%) were in construction. The number of jobs in the tertiary sector was 49. In the tertiary sector; 6 or 12.2% were in wholesale or retail sales or the repair of motor vehicles, 22 or 44.9% were in a hotel or restaurant, 2 or 4.1% were in education.

In 2000, there were 61 workers who commuted into the municipality and 164 workers who commuted away. The municipality is a net exporter of workers, with about 2.7 workers leaving the municipality for every one entering. A total of 65 workers (51.6% of the 126 total workers in the municipality) both lived and worked in Münchenwiler.

Of the working population, 10.9% used public transportation to get to work, and 61.1% used a private car.

In 2011 the average local and cantonal tax rate on a married resident of Münchenwiler making 150,000 CHF was 12.2%, while an unmarried resident's rate was 17.9%. For comparison, the average rate for the entire canton in 2006 was 13.9% and the nationwide rate was 11.6%. In 2009 there were a total of 197 tax payers in the municipality. Of that total, 58 made over 75,000 CHF per year. There were 2 people who made between 15,000 and 20,000 per year. The average income of the over 75,000 CHF group in Münchenwiler was 109,931 CHF, while the average across all of Switzerland was 130,478 CHF.

== Religion ==
From the 2000 census, 272 or 62.7% belonged to the Swiss Reformed Church, while 69 or 15.9% were Roman Catholic. Of the rest of the population, there were 2 members of an Orthodox church (or about 0.46% of the population), and there were 74 individuals (or about 17.05% of the population) who belonged to another Christian church. There were 5 (or about 1.15% of the population) who were Muslims. There was 1 person who was Buddhist, 2 individuals who were Hindu and 1 individual who belonged to another church. 31 (or about 7.14% of the population) belonged to no church, are agnostic or atheist, and 14 individuals (or about 3.23% of the population) did not answer the question.

== Education ==
In Münchenwiler about 51.5% of the population have completed non-mandatory upper secondary education, and 21.7% have completed additional higher education (either university or a Fachhochschule). Of the 55 who had completed some form of tertiary schooling listed in the census, 65.5% were Swiss men, 29.1% were Swiss women.

The Canton of Bern school system provides one year of non-obligatory Kindergarten, followed by six years of Primary school. This is followed by three years of obligatory lower Secondary school where the students are separated according to ability and aptitude. Following the lower Secondary students may attend additional schooling or they may enter an apprenticeship.

During the 2011–12 school year, there were a total of 31 students attending classes in Münchenwiler. There were no kindergarten classes in the municipality. The municipality had 2 primary classes and 31 students. Of the primary students, 25.8% were permanent or temporary residents of Switzerland (not citizens) and 25.8% have a different mother language than the classroom language.

As of 2000, there were a total of 42 students attending any school in the municipality. Of those, 37 both lived and attended school in the municipality, while 5 students came from another municipality. During the same year, 40 residents attended schools outside the municipality.

== Transportation ==
The municipality has a railway station, Münchenwiler-Courgevaux, on the Fribourg–Ins line. It has regular service to Fribourg/Freiburg, Ins, and Neuchâtel.
