= Cressier =

Cressier may refer to:

- Cressier, Fribourg, a municipality in the canton of Fribourg, Switzerland
- Cressier, Neuchâtel, a municipality in the canton of Neuchâtel, Switzerland

== See also ==
- Crissier, a suburb of Lausanne, in the canton of Vaud, Switzerland
