= Jeuss =

- Former municipality
- Coat of arms
- Location of Jeuss
- Location within Switzerland Location within Canton of Fribourg
- Coordinates: 46°54′N 7°10′E
- Country: Switzerland
- Canton: Fribourg
- District: See or du Lac

Government
  - Executive: Gemeinderat with 5 members
  - Mayor: Ammann

Area
  - Total: 1.77 km^{2} (0.68 sq mi)
- Elevation: 544 m (1,785 ft)

Population (Dec 2014)
  - Total: 422
  - Density: 238/km^{2} (617/sq mi)
- Time zone: UTC+01:00 (CET)
  - Summer (DST): UTC+02:00 (CEST)
- Postal code: 1793
- SFOS number: 2264
- ISO 3166 code: CH-FR
- Surrounded by: Cressier, Staatswald Galm, Gurmels, Salvenach
- Website: www.jeuss.ch

Jeuss (German: [jɔʏs]; French: Jentes [ʒɑ̃t]; Arpitan: Juentes [ˈɟɛ̃tɛ]) is a former municipality in the district of See or du Lac in the canton of Fribourg in Switzerland. On 1 January 2016 the former municipalities of Courlevon, Jeuss, Lurtigen and Salvenach merged into Murten.

== History ==
Jeuss is first mentioned in 1340 as Juentes.

== Geography ==
Jeuss had an area, as of 2009, of 1.8 square kilometers (0.69 mi^{2}). Of this area, 1.42 km^{2} (0.55 mi^{2}) or 79.8% is used for agricultural purposes, while 0.19 km^{2} (0.073 mi^{2}) or 10.7% is forested. Of the rest of the land, 0.15 km^{2} (37 acres) or 8.4% is settled (buildings or roads), 0.01 km^{2} (2.5 acres) or 0.6% is either rivers or lakes.

Of the built up area, housing and buildings made up 5.1% and transportation infrastructure made up 2.8%. Out of the forested land, 8.4% of the total land area is heavily forested and 2.2% is covered with orchards or small clusters of trees. Of the agricultural land, 69.7% is used for growing crops and 9.6% is pastures. All the water in the municipality is flowing water.

The former municipality is located in the See/Lac district, on a gravelly terrace between the Biberen valley and Galm forest. It consists of the linear village of Jeuss.

== Coat of arms ==
The blazon of the municipal coat of arms is Azure, a Hive Or issuant from a Base Vert.

== Demographics ==
Jeuss had a population (as of 2014) of 422. As of 2008, 7.7% of the population are resident foreign nationals. Over the last 10 years (2000–2010) the population has changed at a rate of 44.4%. Migration accounted for 26.4%, while births and deaths accounted for 9.5%.

Most of the population (as of 2000) speaks German (359 or 90.9%) as their first language, French is the second most common (16 or 4.1%) and Portuguese is the third (7 or 1.8%). There are 2 people who speak Italian and 1 person who speaks Romansh.

As of 2008, the population was 47.6% male and 52.4% female. The population was made up of 199 Swiss men (44.7% of the population) and 13 (2.9%) non-Swiss men. There were 215 Swiss women (48.3%) and 18 (4.0%) non-Swiss women. Of the population in the municipality, 118 or about 29.9% were born in Jeuss and lived there in 2000. There were 92 or 23.3% who were born in the same canton, while 140 or 35.4% were born somewhere else in Switzerland, and 29 or 7.3% were born outside of Switzerland.

As of 2000, children and teenagers (0–19 years old) make up 27.3% of the population, while adults (20–64 years old) make up 57.5% and seniors (over 64 years old) make up 15.2%.

As of 2000, there were 182 people who were single and never married in the municipality. There were 174 married individuals, 25 widows or widowers and 14 individuals who are divorced.

As of 2000, there were 127 private households in the municipality, and an average of 2.8 persons per household. There were 22 households that consist of only one person and 16 households with five or more people. In 2000, a total of 109 apartments (90.8% of the total) were permanently occupied, while 7 apartments (5.8%) were seasonally occupied and 4 apartments (3.3%) were empty. The vacancy rate for the municipality, in 2010, was 0.69%.

The historical population is given in the following chart:

== Politics ==
In the 2011 federal election the most popular party was the SVP which received 19.8% of the vote. The next three most popular parties were the FDP (18.3%), the SPS (16.4%) and the CVP (13.7%).

The SVP lost about 7.1% of the vote when compared to the 2007 Federal election (26.9% in 2007 vs 19.8% in 2011). The FDP retained about the same popularity (20.4% in 2007), the SPS retained about the same popularity (19.6% in 2007) and the CVP retained about the same popularity (13.3% in 2007). A total of 171 votes were cast in this election, of which 2 or 1.2% were invalid.

== Economy ==
As of 2010, Jeuss had an unemployment rate of 0.1%. As of 2008, there were 23 people employed in the primary economic sector and about 9 businesses involved in this sector. 4 people were employed in the secondary sector and there were 3 businesses in this sector. 84 people were employed in the tertiary sector, with 7 businesses in this sector. There were 188 residents of the municipality who were employed in some capacity, of which females made up 42.6% of the workforce.

In 2008 the total number of full-time equivalent jobs was 86. The number of jobs in the primary sector was 16, of which 15 were in agriculture and 1 was in forestry or lumber production. The number of jobs in the secondary sector was 4 of which 1 was in manufacturing and 3 (75.0%) were in construction. The number of jobs in the tertiary sector was 66. In the tertiary sector; 5 or 7.6% were in wholesale or retail sales or the repair of motor vehicles, 4 or 6.1% were in a hotel or restaurant, 2 or 3.0% were in education and 54 or 81.8% were in health care.

In 2000, there were 45 workers who commuted into the municipality and 139 workers who commuted away. The municipality is a net exporter of workers, with about 3.1 workers leaving the municipality for every one entering. Of the working population, 7.4% used public transportation to get to work, and 63.8% used a private car.

== Religion ==
From the 2000 census, 60 or 15.2% were Roman Catholic, while 272 or 68.9% belonged to the Swiss Reformed Church. Of the rest of the population, there were 13 members of an Orthodox church (or about 3.29% of the population), and there were 20 individuals (or about 5.06% of the population) who belonged to another Christian church. There was 1 individual who was Islamic. There was 1 person who was Buddhist. 29 (or about 7.34% of the population) belonged to no church, are agnostic or atheist, and 9 individuals (or about 2.28% of the population) did not answer the question.

== Education ==
In Jeuss about 138 or (34.9%) of the population have completed non-mandatory upper secondary education, and 50 or (12.7%) have completed additional higher education (either university or a Fachhochschule). Of the 50 who completed tertiary schooling, 64.0% were Swiss men, 24.0% were Swiss women.

The Canton of Fribourg school system provides one year of non-obligatory Kindergarten, followed by six years of Primary school. This is followed by three years of obligatory lower Secondary school where the students are separated according to ability and aptitude. Following the lower Secondary students may attend a three or four year optional upper Secondary school. The upper Secondary school is divided into gymnasium (university preparatory) and vocational programs. After they finish the upper Secondary program, students may choose to attend a Tertiary school or continue their apprenticeship.

During the 2010–11 school year, there were a total of 56 students attending 3 classes in Jeuss. A total of 88 students from the municipality attended any school, either in the municipality or outside of it. There were 2 kindergarten classes with a total of 39 students in the municipality. The municipality had one primary class and 17 students. During the same year, there were no lower secondary classes in the municipality, but 25 students attended lower secondary school in a neighboring municipality. There were no upper Secondary classes or vocational classes, but there were 10 upper Secondary students and 8 upper Secondary vocational students who attended classes in another municipality. The municipality had no non-university Tertiary classes, but there were 2 specialized Tertiary students who attended classes in another municipality.

As of 2000, there were 12 students in Jeuss who came from another municipality, while 43 residents attended schools outside the municipality.
