= Courgevaux =

- Municipality
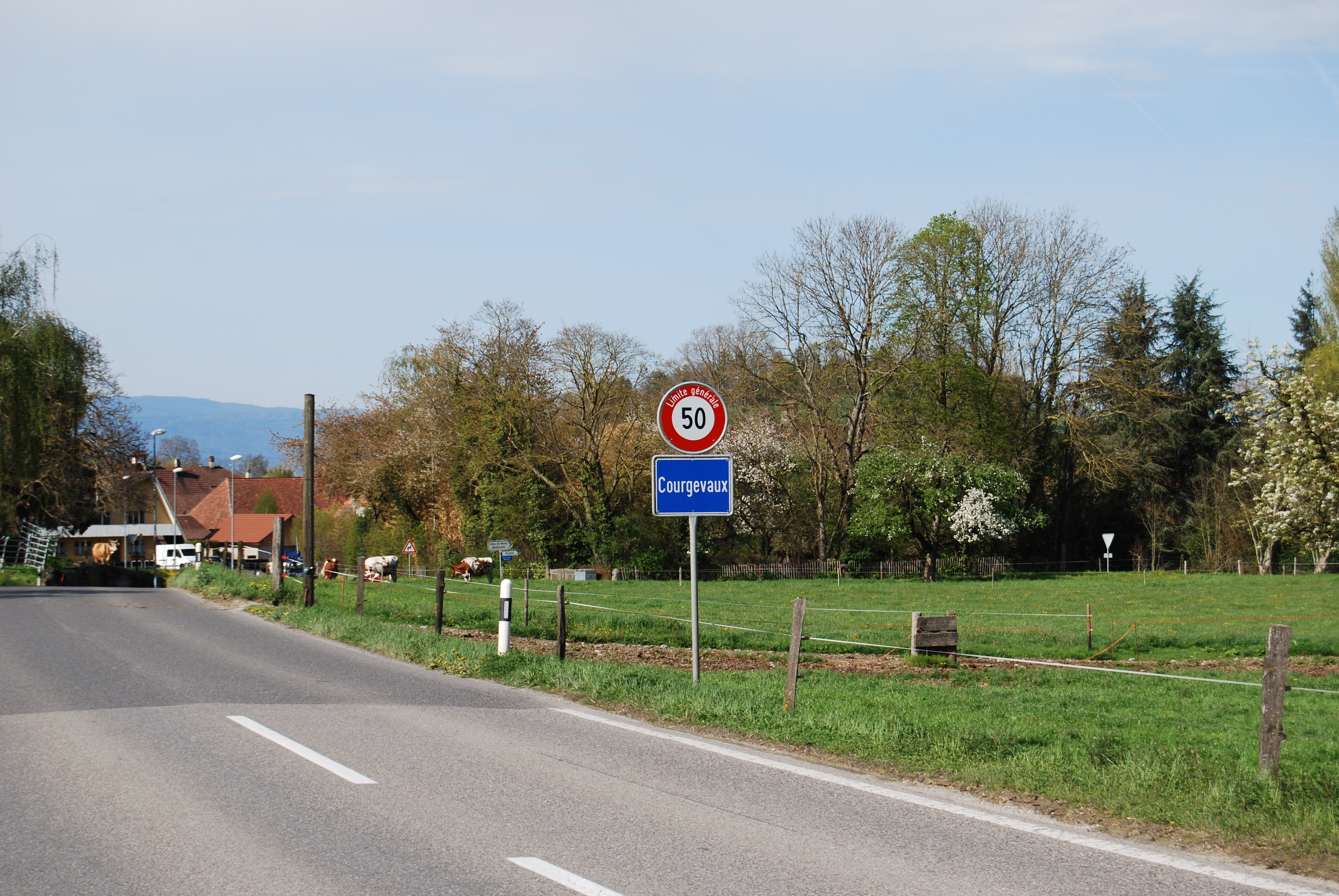

- Flag Coat of arms
- Location of Courgevaux
- Location within Switzerland Location within Canton of Fribourg
- Coordinates: 46°54′N 7°7′E
- Country: Switzerland
- Canton: Fribourg
- District: See or du Lac

Government
  - Executive: Conseil communal/Gemeinderat with 7 members
  - Mayor: Syndic/Gemeindepräsident

Area
  - Total: 3.39 km^{2} (1.31 sq mi)
- Elevation: 475 m (1,558 ft)

Population (December 2020)
  - Total: 1,438
  - Density: 424/km^{2} (1,100/sq mi)
- Time zone: UTC+01:00 (CET)
  - Summer (DST): UTC+02:00 (CEST)
- Postal code: 1796
- SFOS number: 2250
- ISO 3166 code: CH-FR
- Surrounded by: Clavaleyres (BE), Courlevon, Faoug (VD), Greng, Münchenwiler (BE), Murten/Morat, Villarepos
- Website: www.courgevaux.ch

Courgevaux (French: [kuʁʒəvo]; Arpitan: Corgevâlx [kɔʁdzəˈvu]; German: Gurwolf) is a municipality in the district of See or district du Lac in the canton of Fribourg in Switzerland.

== History ==
Courgevaux is first mentioned in 1055 as Corgivul.

== Geography ==
Courgevaux has an area, as of 2009, of 3.4 square kilometers (1.3 mi^{2}). Of this area, 1.96 km^{2} (0.76 mi^{2}) or 58.3% is used for agricultural purposes, while 0.89 km^{2} (0.34 mi^{2}) or 26.5% is forested. Of the rest of the land, 0.54 km^{2} (0.21 mi^{2}) or 16.1% is settled (buildings or roads), 0.02 km^{2} (4.9 acres) or 0.6% is either rivers or lakes.

Of the built up area, industrial buildings made up 2.1% of the total area while housing and buildings made up 6.5% and transportation infrastructure made up 6.0%. Out of the forested land, 23.5% of the total land area is heavily forested and 3.0% is covered with orchards or small clusters of trees. Of the agricultural land, 41.1% is used for growing crops and 15.5% is pastures, while 1.8% is used for orchards or vine crops. All the water in the municipality is flowing water.

The municipality is located in the See/Lac district, on the Murten/Morat-Fribourg road.

== Coat of arms ==
The blazon of the municipal coat of arms is Sable, a Wolf rampant Argent langued Gules.

== Demographics ==
Courgevaux has a population (as of December 2020) of 1,438. As of 2008, 27.0% of the population are resident foreign nationals. Over the last 10 years (2000–2010) the population has changed at a rate of 38.3%. Migration accounted for 35.7%, while births and deaths accounted for 2.9%.

A little more than half of the population (as of 2000) speaks German (510 or 56.5%) as their first language, French is the second most common (272 or 40.1%) and Portuguese is the third (36 or 4.0%). There are 29 people who speak Italian. As of 2024, 60% of the 1437 inhabitants speak German as their first language, 30% French and 10% other languages, according to the website of the municipality.

As of 2008, the population was 50.5% male and 49.5% female. The population was made up of 447 Swiss men (36.7% of the population) and 168 (13.8%) non-Swiss men. There were 455 Swiss women (37.4%) and 148 (12.2%) non-Swiss women. Of the population in the municipality, 194 or about 21.5% were born in Courgevaux and lived there in 2000. There were 201 or 22.3% who were born in the same canton, while 273 or 30.2% were born somewhere else in Switzerland, and 200 or 22.1% were born outside of Switzerland.

As of 2000, children and teenagers (0–19 years old) make up 26.2% of the population, while adults (20–64 years old) make up 61.8% and seniors (over 64 years old) make up 12%.

As of 2000, there were 377 people who were single and never married in the municipality. There were 422 married individuals, 65 widows or widowers and 39 individuals who are divorced.

As of 2000, there were 348 private households in the municipality, and an average of 2.5 persons per household. There were 93 households that consist of only one person and 21 households with five or more people. In 2000, a total of 339 apartments (89.4% of the total) were permanently occupied, while 32 apartments (8.4%) were seasonally occupied and 8 apartments (2.1%) were empty. As of 2009, the construction rate of new housing units was 2.4 new units per 1000 residents. The vacancy rate for the municipality, in 2010, was 0.39%.

The historical population is given in the following chart:

== Politics ==
In the 2011 federal election the most popular party was the SVP which received 26.4% of the vote. The next three most popular parties were the SPS (23.4%), the FDP (13.6%) and the CVP (10.7%).

The SVP lost about 6.6% of the vote when compared to the 2007 Federal election (33.0% in 2007 vs 26.4% in 2011). The SPS retained about the same popularity (22.7% in 2007), the FDP retained about the same popularity (17.6% in 2007) and the CVP retained about the same popularity (12.1% in 2007). A total of 370 votes were cast in this election, of which 6 or 1.6% were invalid.

== Economy ==
As of 2010, Courgevaux had an unemployment rate of 3%. As of 2008, there were 12 people employed in the primary economic sector and about 5 businesses involved in this sector. 264 people were employed in the secondary sector and there were 20 businesses in this sector. 148 people were employed in the tertiary sector, with 24 businesses in this sector. There were 494 residents of the municipality who were employed in some capacity, of which females made up 42.9% of the workforce.

In 2008 the total number of full-time equivalent jobs was 383. The number of jobs in the primary sector was 9, all of which were in agriculture. The number of jobs in the secondary sector was 246 of which 180 or (73.2%) were in manufacturing and 41 (16.7%) were in construction. The number of jobs in the tertiary sector was 128. In the tertiary sector; 81 or 63.3% were in wholesale or retail sales or the repair of motor vehicles, 1 was in the movement and storage of goods, 2 or 1.6% were in the information industry, 12 or 9.4% were technical professionals or scientists, 4 or 3.1% were in education and 15 or 11.7% were in health care.

In 2000, there were 264 workers who commuted into the municipality and 391 workers who commuted away. The municipality is a net exporter of workers, with about 1.5 workers leaving the municipality for every one entering. Of the working population, 7.7% used public transportation to get to work, and 66.4% used a private car.

== Religion ==
From the 2000 census, 294 or 32.6% were Roman Catholic, while 401 or 44.4% belonged to the Swiss Reformed Church. Of the rest of the population, there were 5 members of an Orthodox church (or about 0.55% of the population), and there were 28 individuals (or about 3.10% of the population) who belonged to another Christian church. There was 1 individual who was Jewish, and 64 (or about 7.09% of the population) who were Islamic. There were 1 individual who belonged to another church. 72 (or about 7.97% of the population) belonged to no church, are agnostic or atheist, and 51 individuals (or about 5.65% of the population) did not answer the question.

== Education ==
In Courgevaux about 285 or (31.6%) of the population have completed non-mandatory upper secondary education, and 81 or (9.0%) have completed additional higher education (either university or a Fachhochschule). Of the 81 who completed tertiary schooling, 69.1% were Swiss men, 21.0% were Swiss women, 6.2% were non-Swiss men.

The Canton of Fribourg school system provides one year of non-obligatory Kindergarten, followed by six years of Primary school. This is followed by three years of obligatory lower Secondary school where the students are separated according to ability and aptitude. Following the lower Secondary students may attend a three or four year optional upper Secondary school. The upper Secondary school is divided into gymnasium (university preparatory) and vocational programs. After they finish the upper Secondary program, students may choose to attend a Tertiary school or continue their apprenticeship.

During the 2010-11 school year, there were a total of 56 students attending 3 classes in Courgevaux. A total of 253 students from the municipality attended any school, either in the municipality or outside of it. There was one kindergarten class with a total of 20 students in the municipality. The municipality had 2 primary classes and 36 students. During the same year, there were no lower secondary classes in the municipality, but 55 students attended lower secondary school in a neighboring municipality. There were no upper Secondary classes or vocational classes, but there were 36 upper Secondary students and 38 upper Secondary vocational students who attended classes in another municipality. The municipality had no non-university Tertiary classes, but there was one non-university Tertiary student and 4 specialized Tertiary students who attended classes in another municipality.

As of 2000, there were 24 students in Courgevaux who came from another municipality, while 139 residents attended schools outside the municipality.
