= Clavaleyres =

- Former municipality
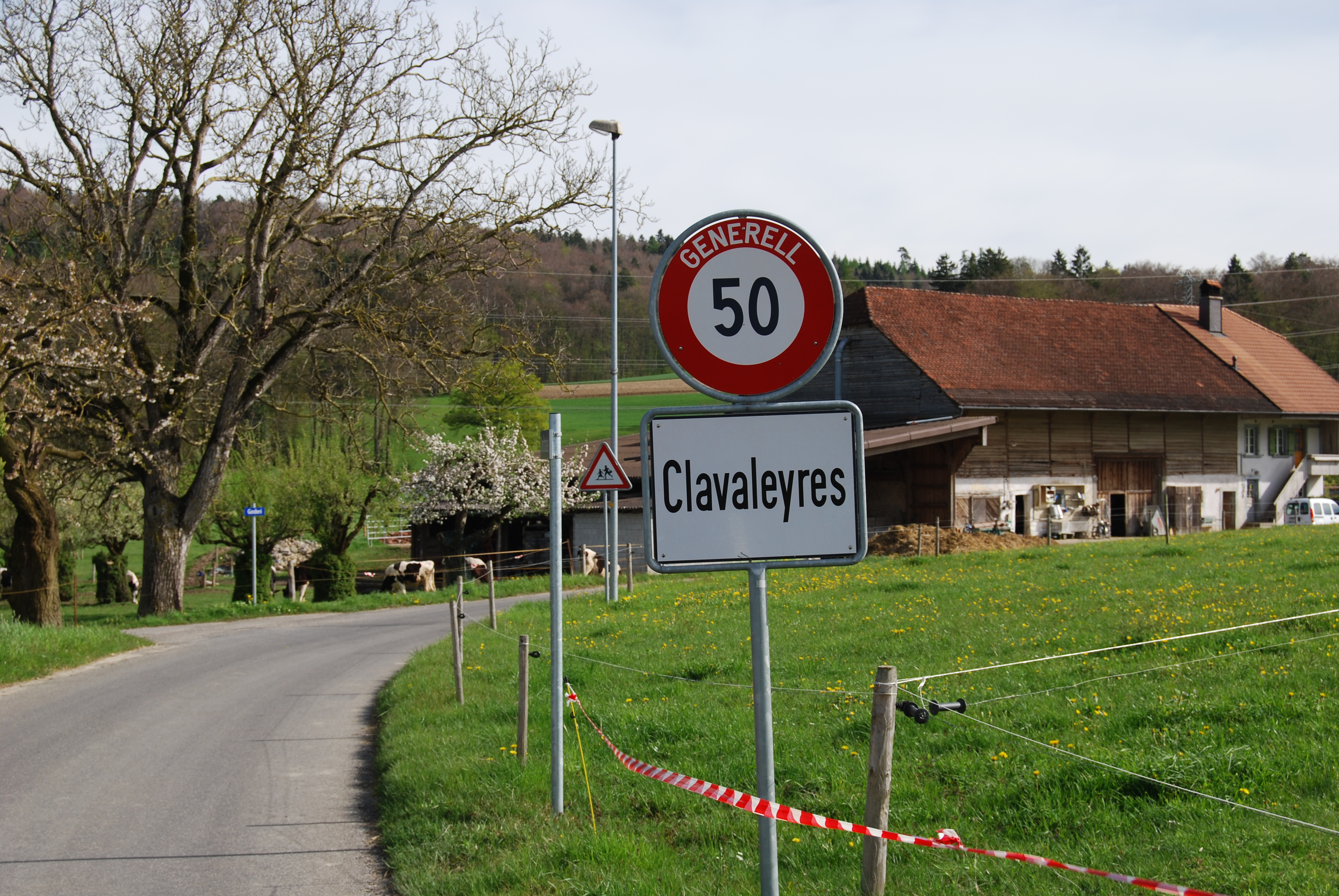
- Clavaleyres village

- Flag Coat of arms
- Location of Clavaleyres
- Location within Switzerland Location within Canton of Fribourg
- Coordinates: 46°53′58″N 7°5′28″E
- Country: Switzerland
- Canton: Fribourg
- District: See District (before 2022: Bern-Mittelland administrative district in the canton of Bern)

Area
  - Total: 1.0 km^{2} (0.39 sq mi)
- Elevation: 454 m (1,490 ft)

Population (Dec 2011)
  - Total: 46
  - Density: 46/km^{2} (120/sq mi)
- Time zone: UTC+01:00 (CET)
  - Summer (DST): UTC+02:00 (CEST)
- Postal code: 1595
- SFOS number: 661
- ISO 3166 code: CH-FR
- Surrounded by: Courgevaux (FR), Faoug (VD), Villarepos (FR)
- Website: SFSO statistics

Clavaleyres was a municipality in the Bern-Mittelland administrative district in the canton of Bern in Switzerland. On 1 January 2022, it merged with Murten in the Canton of Fribourg.

== History ==
Finds of bronze rings imply a settlement in the area during the La Tène era. During the Roman Empire the area was an estate which supplied the nearby city of Aventicum. In the Middle Ages, Clavaleyres was under the lordship of the Münchenwiler Priory. In 1527 the town was acquired by Bern. From 1798 to 1807, the town belonged to the canton of Fribourg, before it was finally returned to the canton of Bern. There have been various attempts to merge the municipality with Münchenwiler, another exclave of the canton of Bern in the nearby area. The proposals have failed because of the opposition of the inhabitants.

In autumn 2018, the populations of Clavaleyres and Murten voted to merge the two municipalities. On 9 February 2020, popular votes in the Canton of Fribourg and Canton of Bern allowed the change of canton. After approval by the Swiss Parliament, the merger took place in January 2022. It marked the first change in the borders of Canton Fribourg in over 200 years.

== Geography ==
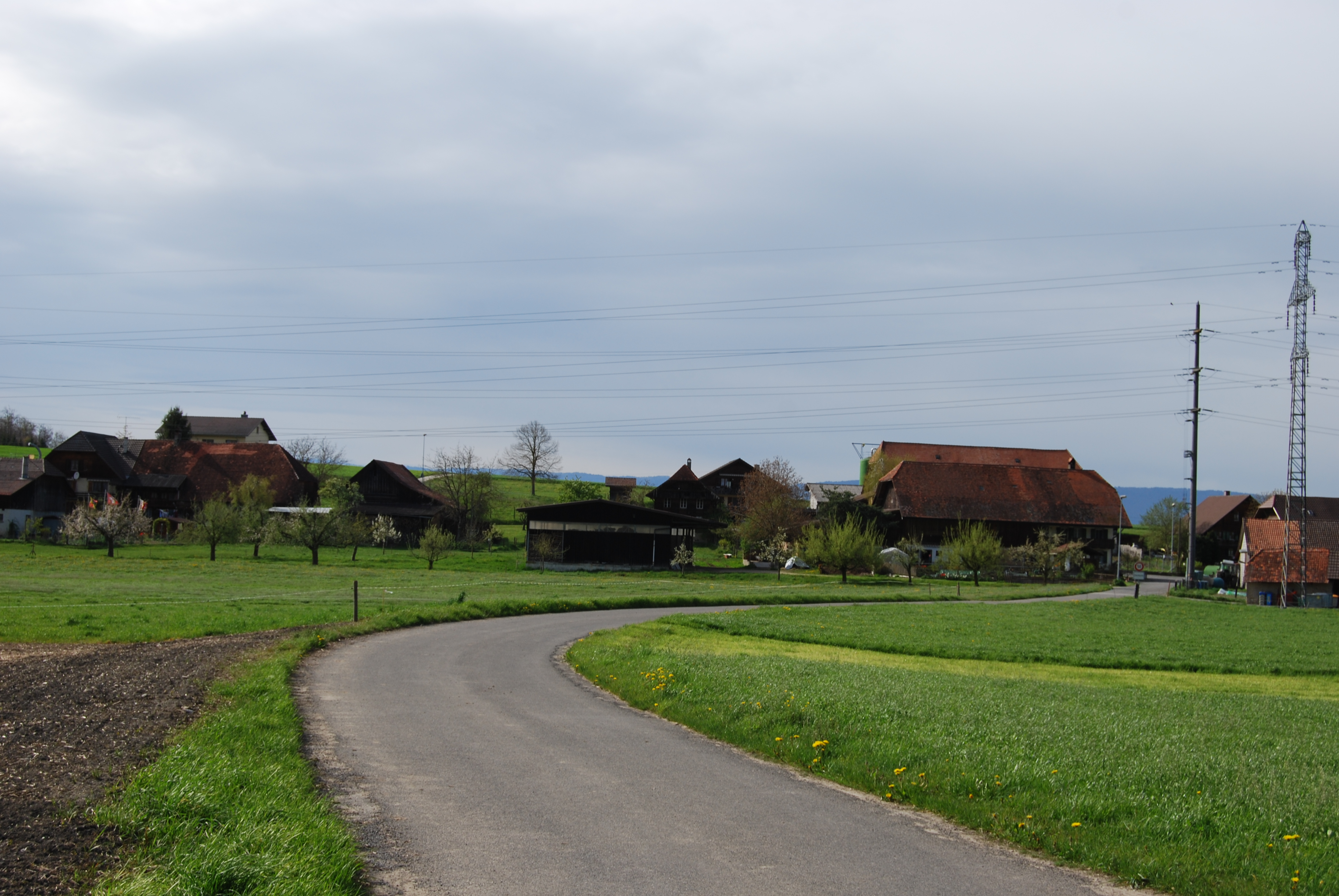
Clavaleyres village and surrounding fields

Clavaleyres has an area of 1 km^{2} (0.39 sq mi). As of 2012, a total of 0.78 km^{2} (0.30 mi^{2}) or 77.2% is used for agricultural purposes, while 0.16 km^{2} (0.062 mi^{2}) or 15.8% is forested. Of the rest of the land, 0.04 km^{2} (9.9 acres) or 4.0% is settled (buildings or roads).

During the same year, housing and buildings made up 2.0% and transportation infrastructure made up 2.0%. Out of the forested land, 13.9% of the total land area is heavily forested and 2.0% is covered with orchards or small clusters of trees. Of the agricultural land, 54.5% is used for growing crops and 21.8% is pastures.

The municipality is located on the shores of Lake Murten. It forms a German-speaking exclave on the border between the French-speaking Cantons of Fribourg and Vaud. It consists of the village of Clavaleyres and scattered farm houses. The area has lost population in the last century; in 1880 it had a population of 118; today it has only 54 inhabitants.

On 31 December 2009 Amtsbezirk Laupen, the municipality's former district, was dissolved. On the following day, 1 January 2010, it joined the newly created Verwaltungskreis Bern-Mittelland.

== Coat of arms ==
The blazon of the municipal coat of arms is Gules a Bear Paw issuant from chief sinister holding a Key Or.

== Demographics ==
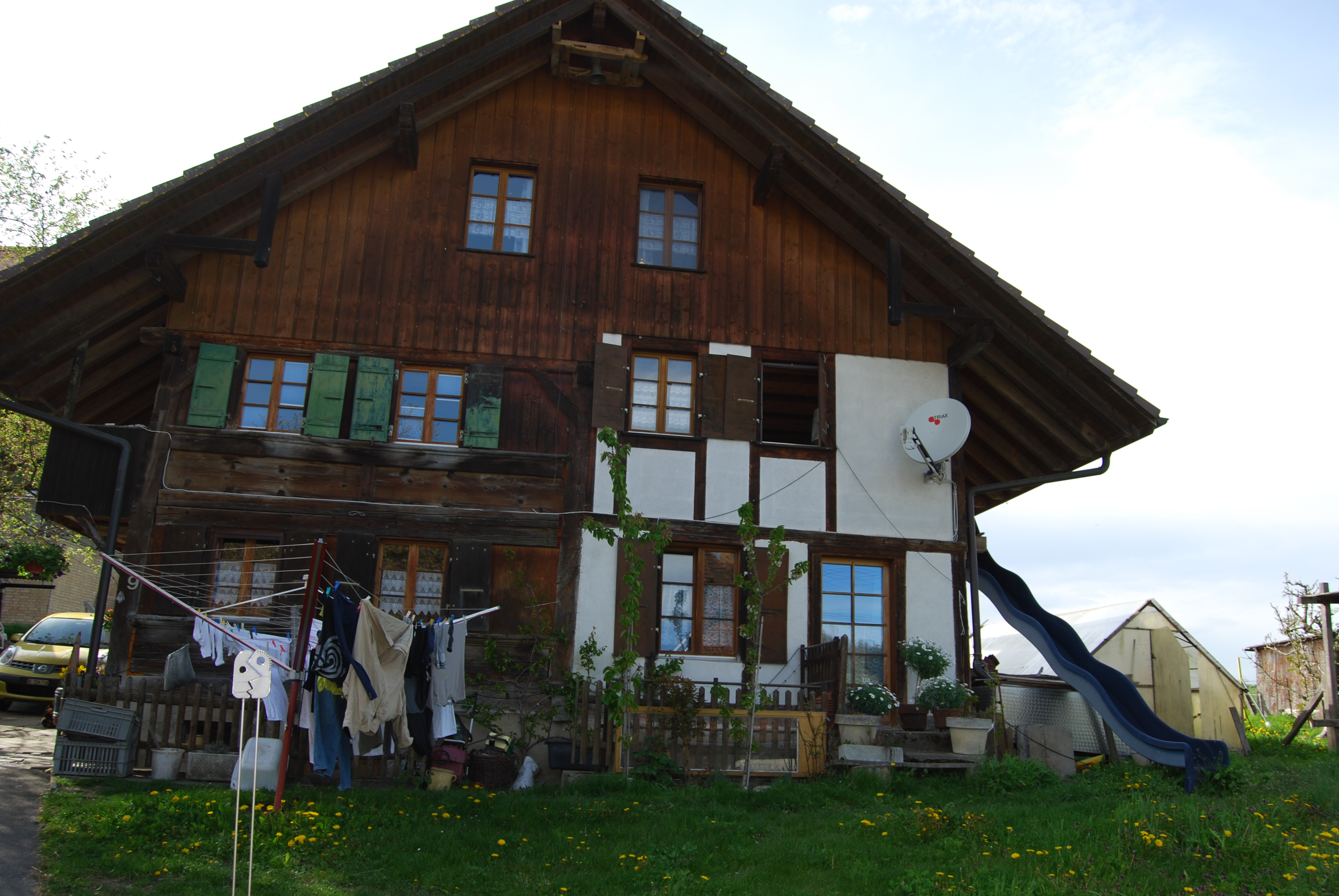
Farm house in the municipality

Clavaleyres has a population (as of December 2020) of 51. As of 2010, 4.2% of the population are resident foreign nationals. Over the last 10 years (2001-2011) the population has changed at a rate of -4.2%. Migration accounted for 0%, while births and deaths accounted for -2.1%.

Most of the population (as of 2000) speaks German (47 or 88.7%) as their first language, French is the second most common (5 or 9.4%) and Polish is the third (1 or 1.9%).

As of 2008, the population was 52.1% male and 47.9% female. The population was made up of 23 Swiss men (47.9% of the population) and 2 (4.2%) non-Swiss men. There were 23 Swiss women (47.9%) and (0.0%) non-Swiss women. Of the population in the municipality, 25 or about 47.2% were born in Clavaleyres and lived there in 2000. There were 16 or 30.2% who were born in the same canton, while 10 or 18.9% were born somewhere else in Switzerland, and 1 or 1.9% were born outside of Switzerland.

As of 2011, children and teenagers (0–19 years old) make up 21.7% of the population, while adults (20–64 years old) make up 60.9% and seniors (over 64 years old) make up 17.4%.

As of 2000, there were 24 people who were single and never married in the municipality. There were 24 married individuals, 2 widows or widowers and 3 individuals who are divorced.

As of 2010, there were 7 households that consist of only one person and 3 households with five or more people. In 2000, a total of 17 apartments (85.0% of the total) were permanently occupied, while 1 apartment was seasonally occupied and 2 apartments were empty.

The historical population is given in the following chart:

== Economy ==
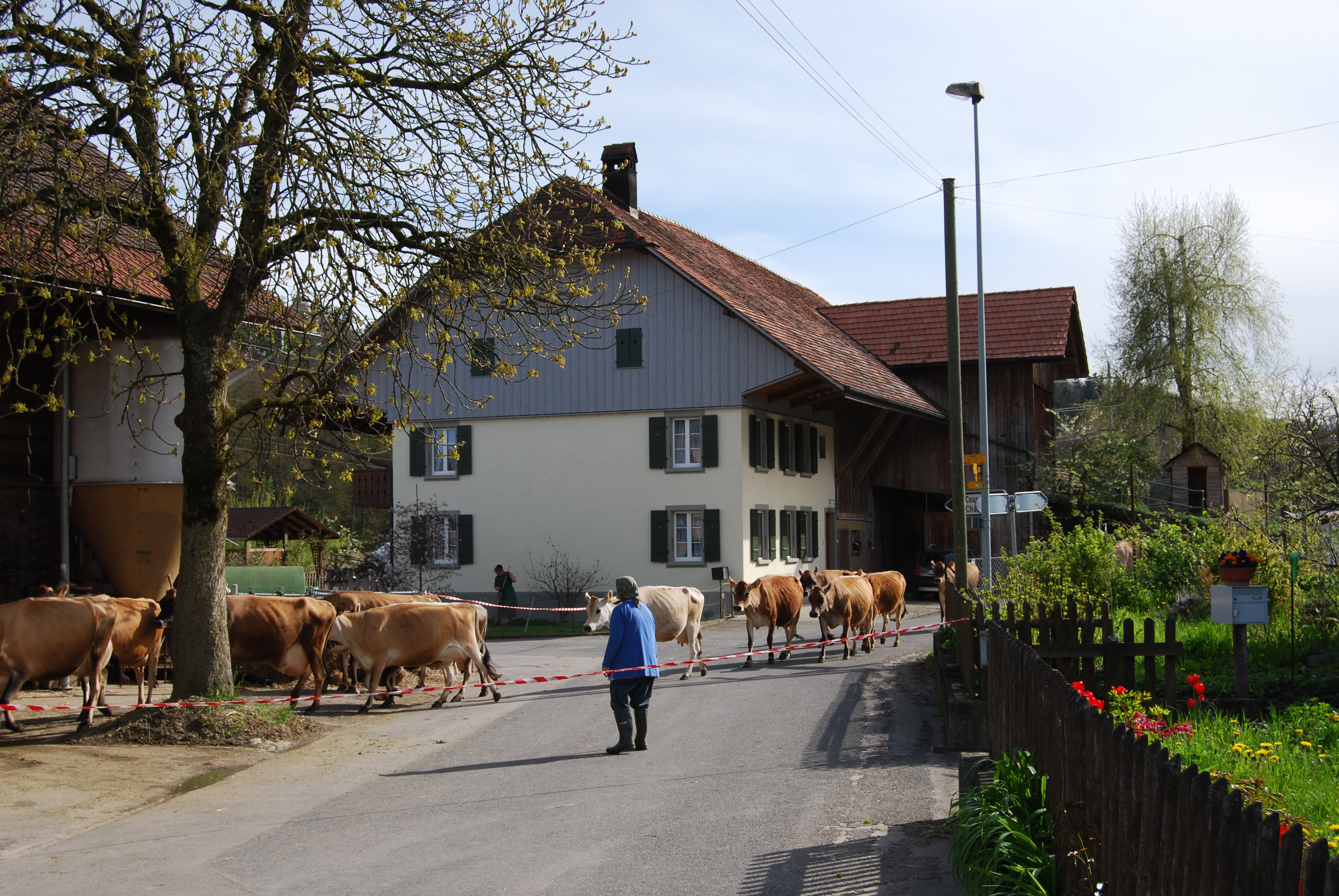
Cattle moving from field to barn in Clavaleyres

As of 2011, Clavaleyres had an unemployment rate of 0%. As of 2008, there were a total of 20 people employed in the municipality. Of these, there were 20 people employed in the primary economic sector and about 7 businesses involved in this sector. No one was employed in the secondary sector or the tertiary sector. There were 31 residents of the municipality who were employed in some capacity, of which females made up 45.2% of the workforce.

In 2008 there were a total of 13 full-time equivalent jobs. The number of jobs in the primary sector was 13, all of which were in agriculture.

In 2000, there were 16 workers who commuted away from the municipality. A total of 15 workers (93.8% of the 16 total workers in the municipality) both lived and worked in Clavaleyres. Of the working population, 3.2% used public transportation to get to work, and 45.2% used a private car.

In 2011 the average local and cantonal tax rate on a married resident of Clavaleyres making 150,000 CHF was 12.8%, while an unmarried resident's rate was 18.8%. For comparison, the average rate for the entire canton in 2006 was 13.9% and the nationwide rate was 11.6%. In 2009 there were a total of 20 tax payers in the municipality. Of that total, 2 made over 75 thousand CHF per year. The greatest number of workers, 6, made between 50 and 75 thousand CHF per year. The average income of the over 75,000 CHF group in Clavaleyres was 86,750 CHF, while the average across all of Switzerland was 130,478 CHF.

== Religion ==
From the 2000 census, 38 or 71.7% belonged to the Swiss Reformed Church, while 1 or 1.9% was Roman Catholic. Of the rest of the population, there were 24 individuals (or about 45.28% of the population) who belonged to another Christian church. 1 (or about 1.89% of the population) belonged to no church, are agnostic or atheist, and 1 individual (or about 1.89% of the population) did not answer the question.

== Education ==
In Clavaleyres about 51.5% of the population have completed non-mandatory upper secondary education, and 24.2% have completed additional higher education (either university or a Fachhochschule). Of the 11 who had completed some form of tertiary schooling listed in the census, 54.5% were Swiss men, 45.5% were Swiss women.

There is no school in the small municipality so the children go to Münchenwiler for school. As of 2000, 7 residents attended schools outside the municipality.
