= Salvenach =

- Former municipality
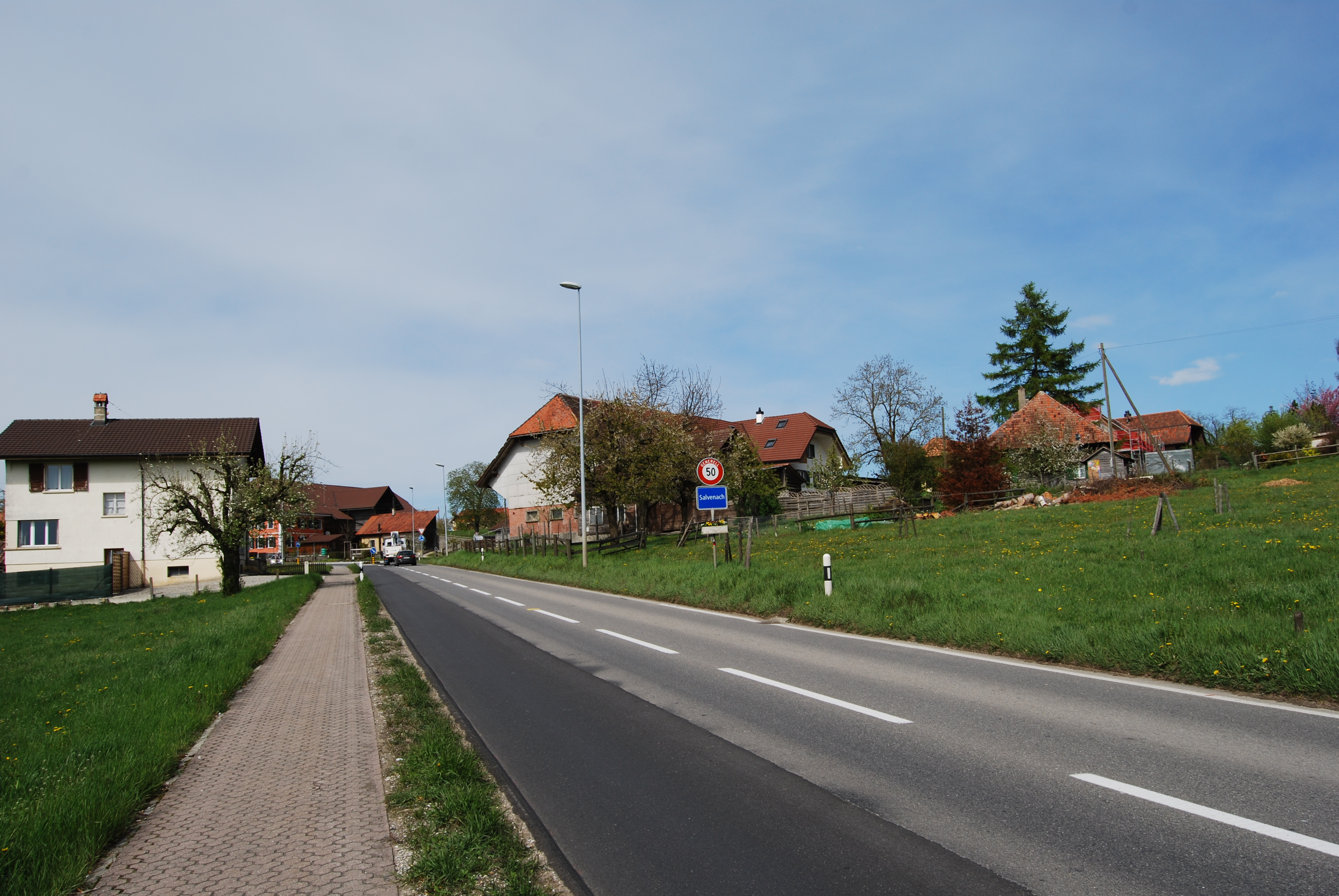

- Coat of arms
- Location of Salvenach
- Location within Switzerland Location within Canton of Fribourg
- Coordinates: 46°55′N 7°9′E
- Country: Switzerland
- Canton: Fribourg
- District: See

Government
  - Executive: Gemeinderat with 5 members
  - Mayor: Ammann

Area
  - Total: 3.85 km^{2} (1.49 sq mi)
- Elevation: 561 m (1,841 ft)

Population (Dec 2014)
  - Total: 551
  - Density: 143/km^{2} (371/sq mi)
- Time zone: UTC+01:00 (CET)
  - Summer (DST): UTC+02:00 (CEST)
- Postal code: 1794
- SFOS number: 2277
- ISO 3166 code: CH-FR
- Surrounded by: Cressier, Staatswald Galm, Jeuss, Lurtigen, Münchenwiler (BE), Murten/Morat
- Website: www.salvenach.ch

Salvenach (French name: Salvagny; Arpitan: Cervagné [θəvaˈɲi]) is a former municipality in the district of See in the canton of Fribourg in Switzerland. It was one of the municipalities with a large majority of German speakers in the mostly French speaking Canton of Fribourg. On 1 January 2016 the former municipalities of Courlevon, Jeuss, Lurtigen and Salvenach merged into Murten.

== History ==
Salvenach is first mentioned in 1179 as Salvegnez.

== Geography ==
Salvenach had an area of 3.81 km^{2} (1.47 mi^{2}) Of this area, 2.67 km^{2} (1.03 mi^{2}) or 70.1% is used for agricultural purposes, while 0.87 km^{2} (0.34 mi^{2}) or 22.8% is forested. Of the rest of the land, 0.3 km^{2} (0.12 mi^{2}) or 7.9% is settled (buildings or roads).

Of the built up area, housing and buildings made up 4.5% and transportation infrastructure made up 3.4%. Out of the forested land, all of the forested land area is covered with heavy forests. Of the agricultural land, 57.5% is used for growing crops and 11.8% is pastures.

The former municipality is located in the See/Lac district, east of Murten on a plain. It consists of the linear village of Salvenach.

== Coat of arms ==
The blazon of the municipal coat of arms is Gules, three Acorns Or slipped issuant from Coupeaux Vert.

== Demographics ==
Salvenach had a population (as of 2014) of 551. As of 2008, 5.4% of the population are resident foreign nationals. Over the last 10 years (2000–2010) the population has changed at a rate of 24%. Migration accounted for 25.7%, while births and deaths accounted for 0.5%.

Most of the population (as of 2000) speaks German (385 or 96.3%) as their first language, French is the second most common (8 or 2.0%) and Portuguese is the third (3 or 0.8%).

As of 2008, the population was 51.0% male and 49.0% female. The population was made up of 249 Swiss men (48.8% of the population) and 11 (2.2%) non-Swiss men. There were 233 Swiss women (45.7%) and 17 (3.3%) non-Swiss women. Of the population in the municipality, 139 or about 34.8% were born in Salvenach and lived there in 2000. There were 87 or 21.8% who were born in the same canton, while 140 or 35.0% were born somewhere else in Switzerland, and 19 or 4.8% were born outside of Switzerland.

As of 2000, children and teenagers (0–19 years old) make up 25.5% of the population, while adults (20–64 years old) make up 59.5% and seniors (over 64 years old) make up 15%.

As of 2000, there were 159 people who were single and never married in the municipality. There were 198 married individuals, 29 widows or widowers and 14 individuals who are divorced.

As of 2000, there were 155 private households in the municipality, and an average of 2.6 persons per household. There were 45 households that consist of only one person and 17 households with five or more people. In 2000, a total of 153 apartments (95.0% of the total) were permanently occupied, while 3 apartments (1.9%) were seasonally occupied and 5 apartments (3.1%) were empty. As of 2009, the construction rate of new housing units was 2 new units per 1000 residents. The vacancy rate for the municipality, in 2010, was 0.97%.

The historical population is given in the following chart:

== Heritage sites of national significance ==
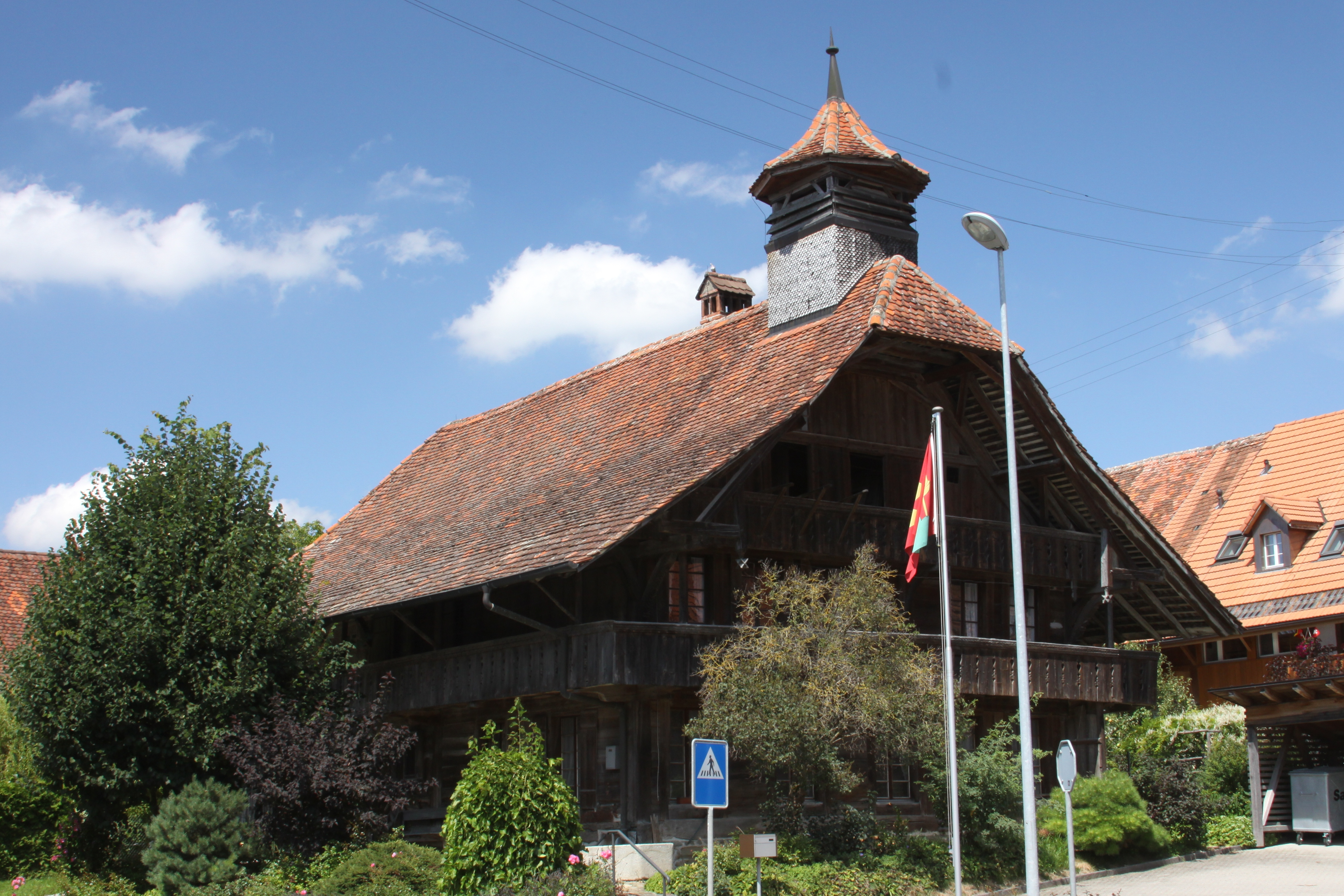
Old school house building

The Old School House is listed as a Swiss heritage site of national significance. The entire village of Salvenach is part of the Inventory of Swiss Heritage Sites.

== Politics ==
In the 2011 federal election the most popular party was the SVP which received 27.5% of the vote. The next three most popular parties were the CVP (14.2%), the FDP (12.5%) and the SPS (10.3%).

The SVP received about the same percentage of the vote as they did in the 2007 Federal election (30.0% in 2007 vs 27.5% in 2011). The CVP moved from fourth in 2007 (with 13.9%) to second in 2011, the FDP retained about the same popularity (14.8% in 2007) and the SPS moved from second in 2007 (with 15.6%) to fourth. A total of 203 votes were cast in this election, of which 1 or 0.5% was invalid.

== Economy ==
As of 2010, Salvenach had an unemployment rate of 1.3%. As of 2008, there were 33 people employed in the primary economic sector and about 14 businesses involved in this sector. 25 people were employed in the secondary sector and there were 7 businesses in this sector. 31 people were employed in the tertiary sector, with 7 businesses in this sector. There were 219 residents of the municipality who were employed in some capacity, of which females made up 44.7% of the workforce.

In 2008 the total number of full-time equivalent jobs was 74. The number of jobs in the primary sector was 24, all of which were in agriculture. The number of jobs in the secondary sector was 24 of which 6 or (25.0%) were in manufacturing and 18 (75.0%) were in construction. The number of jobs in the tertiary sector was 26. In the tertiary sector; 16 or 61.5% were in wholesale or retail sales or the repair of motor vehicles, 6 or 23.1% were technical professionals or scientists, 2 or 7.7% were in education.

In 2000, there were 17 workers who commuted into the municipality and 153 workers who commuted away. The municipality is a net exporter of workers, with about 9.0 workers leaving the municipality for every one entering. Of the working population, 9.6% used public transportation to get to work, and 59.4% used a private car.

== Religion ==
From the 2000 census, 51 or 12.8% were Roman Catholic, while 288 or 72.0% belonged to the Swiss Reformed Church. Of the rest of the population, there were 52 individuals (or about 13.00% of the population) who belonged to another Christian church. 27 (or about 6.75% of the population) belonged to no church, are agnostic or atheist, and 8 individuals (or about 2.00% of the population) did not answer the question.

== Education ==
In Salvenach about 167 or (41.8%) of the population have completed non-mandatory upper secondary education, and 45 or (11.3%) have completed additional higher education (either university or a Fachhochschule). Of the 45 who completed tertiary schooling, 73.3% were Swiss men, 24.4% were Swiss women.

The Canton of Fribourg school system provides one year of non-obligatory Kindergarten, followed by six years of Primary school. This is followed by three years of obligatory lower Secondary school where the students are separated according to ability and aptitude. Following the lower Secondary students may attend a three or four year optional upper Secondary school. The upper Secondary school is divided into gymnasium (university preparatory) and vocational programs. After they finish the upper Secondary program, students may choose to attend a Tertiary school or continue their apprenticeship.

During the 2010–11 school year, there were a total of 41 students attending 2 classes in Salvenach. A total of 81 students from the municipality attended any school, either in the municipality or outside of it. There were no kindergarten classes in the municipality, but 8 students attended kindergarten in a neighboring municipality. The municipality had 2 primary classes and 41 students. During the same year, there were no lower secondary classes in the municipality, but 16 students attended lower secondary school in a neighboring municipality. There were no upper Secondary classes or vocational classes, but there were 9 upper Secondary students and 12 upper Secondary vocational students who attended classes in another municipality. The municipality had no non-university Tertiary classes. who attended classes in another municipality.

As of 2000, there were 20 students in Salvenach who came from another municipality, while 46 residents attended schools outside the municipality.
