= Wallenried =

- Former municipality
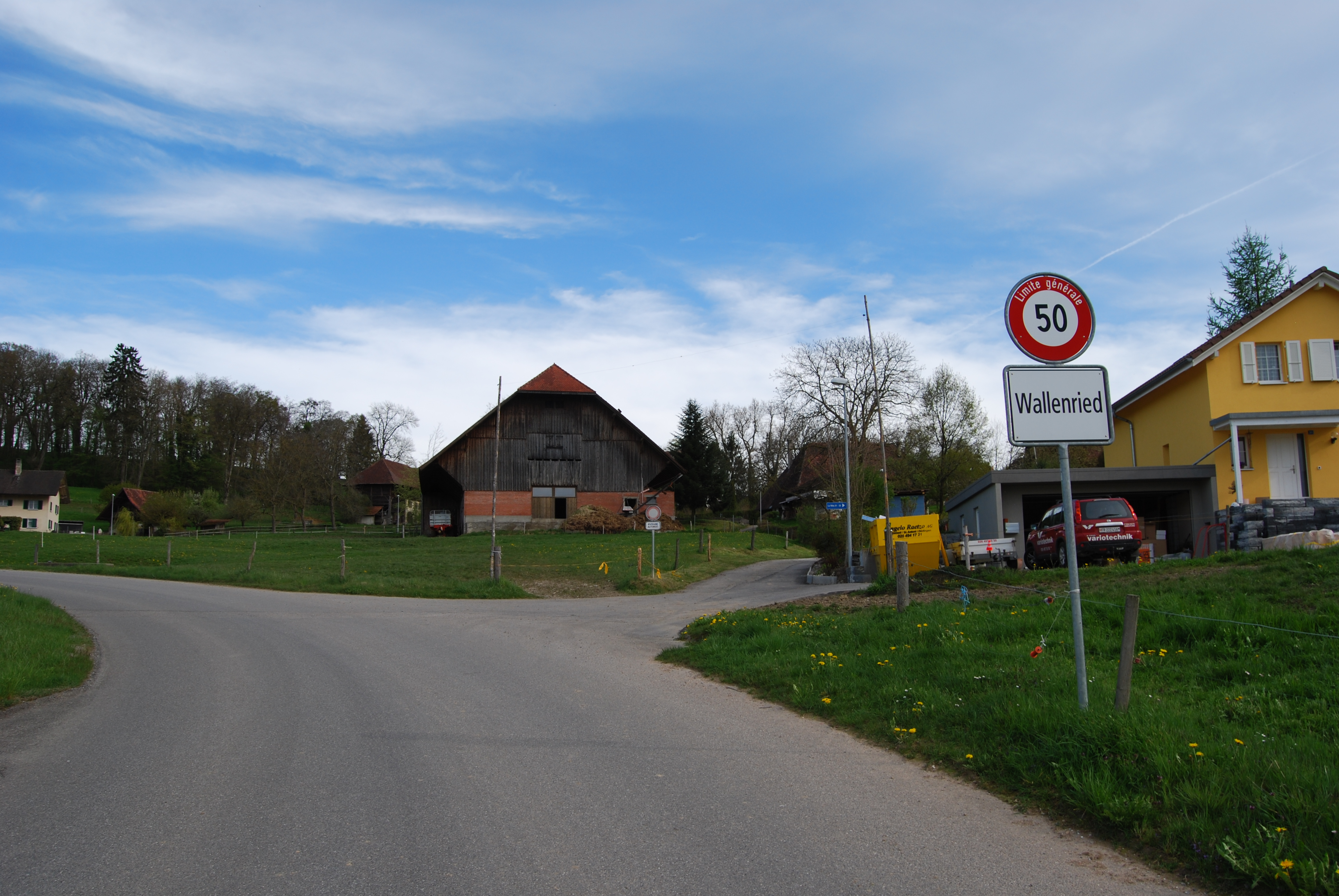

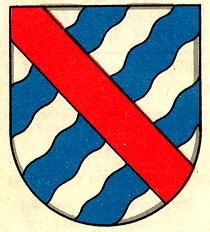
- Coat of arms
- Location of Wallenried
- Location within Switzerland Location within Canton of Fribourg
- Coordinates: 46°52′N 7°7′E
- Country: Switzerland
- Canton: Fribourg
- District: See

Government
  - Executive: Conseil communal with 5 members
  - Mayor: Syndic

Area
  - Total: 3.88 km^{2} (1.50 sq mi)
- Elevation: 559 m (1,834 ft)

Population (Dec 2015)
  - Total: 447
  - Density: 115/km^{2} (298/sq mi)
- Time zone: UTC+01:00 (CET)
  - Summer (DST): UTC+02:00 (CEST)
- Postal code: 1784
- SFOS number: 2283
- ISO 3166 code: CH-FR
- Surrounded by: Courlevon, Courtepin, Cressier, Gurmels, Misery-Courtion, Villarepos
- Website: www.wallenried.ch

Wallenried (French name: Esserts; Arpitan: Èssèrsâ [esəˈʃɑ]) is a former municipality in the district of See in the canton of Fribourg in Switzerland. It was one of the municipalities with a large minority of German speakers in a French speaking region.

== Geography ==
Wallenried had an area of 3.86 km^{2} (1.49 sq mi). Of this area, 2.39 km^{2} (0.92 mi^{2}) or 61.9% is used for agricultural purposes, while 0.67 km^{2} (0.26 mi^{2}) or 17.4% is forested. Of the rest of the land, 0.81 km^{2} (0.31 mi^{2}) or 21.0% is settled (buildings or roads) and 0.01 km^{2} (2.5 acres) or 0.3% is unproductive land.

Of the built up area, housing and buildings made up 3.4% and transportation infrastructure made up 2.3%. Power and water infrastructure as well as other special developed areas made up 2.3% of the area while parks, green belts and sports fields made up 12.7%. Out of the forested land, all of the forested land area is covered with heavy forests. Of the agricultural land, 40.7% is used for growing crops and 19.2% is pastures, while 2.1% is used for orchards or vine crops.

== Coat of arms ==
The blazon of the municipal coat of arms is Argent three Bends sinister wavy Azure and overall a Bend Gules.

== Demographics ==
Wallenried had a population (as of 2015) of 447. As of 2008, 8.3% of the population are resident foreign nationals. Over the last 10 years (2000–2010) the population has changed at a rate of 30.6%. Migration accounted for 26.1%, while births and deaths accounted for 6.3%.

Most of the population (as of 2000) speaks French (168 or 53.5%) as their first language, German is the second most common (137 or 43.6%) and Italian is the third (2 or 0.6%). There is 1 person who speaks Romansh.

As of 2008, the population was 49.4% male and 50.6% female. The population was made up of 195 Swiss men (44.6% of the population) and 21 (4.8%) non-Swiss men. There were 201 Swiss women (46.0%) and 20 (4.6%) non-Swiss women. Of the population in the municipality, 101 or about 32.2% were born in Wallenried and lived there in 2000. There were 119 or 37.9% who were born in the same canton, while 67 or 21.3% were born somewhere else in Switzerland, and 21 or 6.7% were born outside of Switzerland.

As of 2000, children and teenagers (0–19 years old) make up 25.5% of the population, while adults (20–64 years old) make up 62.1% and seniors (over 64 years old) make up 12.4%.

As of 2000, there were 119 people who were single and never married in the municipality. There were 163 married individuals, 20 widows or widowers and 12 individuals who are divorced.

As of 2000, there were 113 private households in the municipality, and an average of 2.7 persons per household. There were 24 households that consist of only one person and 13 households with five or more people. In 2000, a total of 112 apartments (91.1% of the total) were permanently occupied, while 10 apartments (8.1%) were seasonally occupied and one apartment was empty. As of 2009, the construction rate of new housing units was 9.2 new units per 1000 residents. The vacancy rate for the municipality, in 2010, was 1.75%.

The historical population is given in the following chart:

== Politics ==
In the 2011 federal election the most popular party was the SVP which received 29.8% of the vote. The next three most popular parties were the SPS (27.2%), the CVP (14.2%) and the FDP (10.9%).

The SVP lost about 5.4% of the vote when compared to the 2007 Federal election (35.2% in 2007 vs 29.8% in 2011). The SPS gained popularity (21.7% in 2007), the CVP lost popularity (20.1% in 2007) and the FDP retained about the same popularity (9.8% in 2007). A total of 156 votes were cast in this election, of which 3 or 1.9% were invalid.

== Economy ==
As of 2010, Wallenried had an unemployment rate of 1.8%. As of 2008, there were 35 people employed in the primary economic sector and about 12 businesses involved in this sector. 5 people were employed in the secondary sector and there was 1 business in this sector. 31 people were employed in the tertiary sector, with 4 businesses in this sector. There were 168 residents of the municipality who were employed in some capacity, of which females made up 42.3% of the workforce.

In 2008 the total number of full-time equivalent jobs was 52. The number of jobs in the primary sector was 26, all of which were in agriculture. The number of jobs in the secondary sector was 4, all of which were in manufacturing. The number of jobs in the tertiary sector was 22. In the tertiary sector; 1 was in the sale or repair of motor vehicles and 2 or 9.1% were technical professionals or scientists.

In 2000, there were 21 workers who commuted into the municipality and 129 workers who commuted away. The municipality is a net exporter of workers, with about 6.1 workers leaving the municipality for every one entering. Of the working population, 8.3% used public transportation to get to work, and 63.1% used a private car.

== Religion ==
From the 2000 census, 185 or 58.9% were Roman Catholic, while 91 or 29.0% belonged to the Swiss Reformed Church. Of the rest of the population, there was 1 member of an Orthodox church, and there were 18 individuals (or about 5.73% of the population) who belonged to another Christian church. There was 1 person who was Buddhist. 20 (or about 6.37% of the population) belonged to no church, are agnostic or atheist, and 7 individuals (or about 2.23% of the population) did not answer the question.

== Education ==
In Wallenried about 125 or (39.8%) of the population have completed non-mandatory upper secondary education, and 43 or (13.7%) have completed additional higher education (either university or a Fachhochschule). Of the 43 who completed tertiary schooling, 65.1% were Swiss men, 20.9% were Swiss women.

The Canton of Fribourg school system provides one year of non-obligatory Kindergarten, followed by six years of Primary school. This is followed by three years of obligatory lower Secondary school where the students are separated according to ability and aptitude. Following the lower Secondary students may attend a three or four year optional upper Secondary school. The upper Secondary school is divided into gymnasium (university preparatory) and vocational programs. After they finish the upper Secondary program, students may choose to attend a Tertiary school or continue their apprenticeship.

During the 2010-11 school year, there were no students attending school in Wallenried, but a total of 88 students attended school in other municipalities. Of these students, 13 were in kindergarten, 36 were in a primary school, 18 were in a mandatory secondary school, 9 were in an upper secondary school and 8 were in a vocational secondary program. There were a total of 4 tertiary students from Wallenried.

As of 2000, there were 2 students in Wallenried who came from another municipality, while 50 residents attended schools outside the municipality.
