= Coussiberlé =

Village and former municipality in Fribourg, Switzerland

Coordinates: 46.900°N 7.117°E

Coussiberlé (German: Cussiberle or Guschubürli) is a village and former municipality in the district of See in the canton of Fribourg, Switzerland.

It was first recorded in 1425 as Corsibellay.

The municipality had ca. 30 inhabitants in 1558, which increased to 58 in 1811, 63 in 1850, and 80 in 1900. It then declined, to 58 in 1950 and 51 in 2000.

In 1974 the municipality was incorporated into the larger, neighboring municipality Courlevon.
