= Lurtigen =

Lurtigen/Lourtens
- Former municipality
- Coat of arms
- Location of Lurtigen/Lourtens
- Location within Switzerland Location within Canton of Fribourg
- Coordinates: 46°56′N 7°10′E
- Country: Switzerland
- Canton: Fribourg
- District: See

Government
  - Executive: Gemeinderat with 5 members
  - Mayor: Ammann

Area
  - Total: 2.30 km^{2} (0.89 sq mi)
- Elevation: 567 m (1,860 ft)

Population (Dec 2014)
  - Total: 183
  - Density: 79.6/km^{2} (206/sq mi)
- Time zone: UTC+01:00 (CET)
  - Summer (DST): UTC+02:00 (CEST)
- Postal code: 3215
- SFOS number: 2270
- ISO 3166 code: CH-FR
- Surrounded by: Büchslen, Staatswald Galm, Gempenach, Murten/Morat, Salvenach, Ulmiz
- Website: SFSO statistics

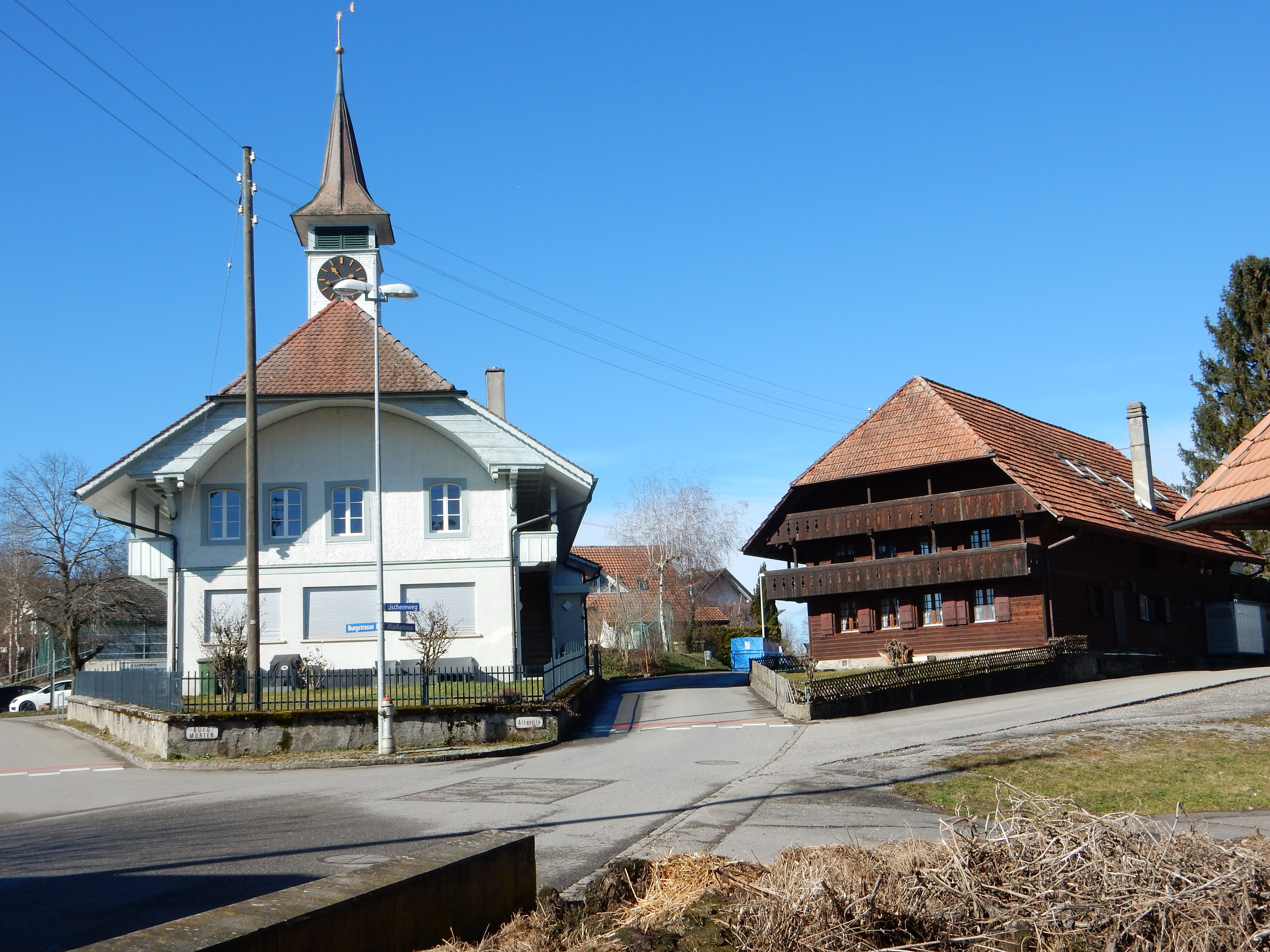
Lurtigen with the school building (left)

Lurtigen (German) or Lourtens (French: [luʁtɑ̃s], Franco-Provençal: [lyʁˈtɛ̃]) is a former municipality in the district of See in the canton of Fribourg in Switzerland. Its French name, little-used today, is Lourtens. It is one of the municipalities with a large majority of German speakers in the mostly French speaking Canton of Fribourg. On 1 January 2016 the former municipalities of Courlevon, Jeuss, Lurtigen and Salvenach merged into Murten.

== History ==
Lurtigen is first mentioned in 1397 as Lurtens. In 1508 it was mentioned as Lurting.

== Geography ==
Lurtigen had an area of 2.32 km^{2} (0.90 mi^{2}). Of this area, 1.38 km^{2} (0.53 mi^{2}) or 59.5% is used for agricultural purposes, while 0.78 km^{2} (0.30 mi^{2}) or 33.6% is forested. Of the rest of the land, 0.14 km^{2} (35 acres) or 6.0% is settled (buildings or roads).

Of the built up area, housing and buildings made up 3.4% and transportation infrastructure made up 2.2%. Out of the forested land, 31.5% of the total land area is heavily forested and 2.2% is covered with orchards or small clusters of trees. Of the agricultural land, 46.1% is used for growing crops and 9.9% is pastures, while 3.4% is used for orchards or vine crops.

The former municipality is located in the See/Lac district. The village lies between Morat and Laupen in a small clearing completely surrounded by woods, a location which is probably unique in the modern Swiss Plateau.

== Coat of arms ==
The blazon of the municipal coat of arms is Argent three Roses Gules in pale seeded and barbed proper.

== Demographics ==
Lurtigen had a population (as of 2014) of 183, all Swiss citizens. Over the last 10 years (2000–2010) the population has changed at a rate of -4.8%. Migration accounted for -4.3%, while births and deaths accounted for 0%.

Most of the population (as of 2000) speaks German (175 or 97.8%) as their first language, French is the second most common (2 or 1.1%) and Portuguese is the third (1 or 0.6%).

As of 2008, the population was 50.6% male and 49.4% female. The population was made up of 88 Swiss men (49.4% of the population) and 2 (1.1%) non-Swiss men. There were 88 Swiss women (49.4%) and (0.0%) non-Swiss women. Of the population in the municipality, 87 or about 48.6% were born in Lurtigen and lived there in 2000. There were 34 or 19.0% who were born in the same canton, while 56 or 31.3% were born somewhere else in Switzerland, and 2 or 1.1% were born outside of Switzerland.

As of 2000, children and teenagers (0–19 years old) make up 26.8% of the population, while adults (20–64 years old) make up 62.6% and seniors (over 64 years old) make up 10.6%.

As of 2000, there were 75 people who were single and never married in the municipality. There were 85 married individuals, 13 widows or widowers and 6 individuals who are divorced.

As of 2000, there were 69 private households in the municipality, and an average of 2.6 persons per household. There were 18 households that consist of only one person and 6 households with five or more people. In 2000, a total of 68 apartments (94.4% of the total) were permanently occupied, while 2 apartments (2.8%) were seasonally occupied and 2 apartments (2.8%) were empty. As of 2009, the construction rate of new housing units was 11.2 new units per 1000 residents.

The historical population is given in the following chart:

== Sights ==
The entire village of Lurtigen is designated as part of the Inventory of Swiss Heritage Sites.

== Politics ==
In the 2011 federal election the most popular party was the CVP which received 33.9% of the vote. The next three most popular parties were the SVP (23.4%), the FDP (14.6%) and the SPS (8.9%).

The CVP improved their position in Lurtigen rising to first, from third in 2007 (with 20.5%) The SVP moved from first in 2007 (with 34.4%) to second in 2011, the FDP moved from second in 2007 (with 23.2%) to third and the SPS moved from below fourth place in 2007 to fourth. A total of 96 votes were cast in this election, of which 1 or 1.0% were invalid.

== Economy ==
As of 2010, Lurtigen had an unemployment rate of 0.7%. As of 2008, there were 37 people employed in the primary economic sector and about 9 businesses involved in this sector. 17 people were employed in the secondary sector and there were 3 businesses in this sector. 5 people were employed in the tertiary sector, with 2 businesses in this sector. There were 110 residents of the municipality who were employed in some capacity, of which females made up 40.0% of the workforce.

In 2008 the total number of full-time equivalent jobs was 40. The number of jobs in the primary sector was 22, all of which were in agriculture. The number of jobs in the secondary sector was 15 of which 4 or (26.7%) were in manufacturing and 11 (73.3%) were in construction. The number of jobs in the tertiary sector was 3. In the tertiary sector; 1 was in the sale or repair of motor vehicles, 2 or 66.7% were in education.

In 2000, there were 6 workers who commuted into the municipality and 77 workers who commuted away. The municipality is a net exporter of workers, with about 12.8 workers leaving the municipality for every one entering. Of the working population, 4.5% used public transportation to get to work, and 62.7% used a private car.

== Religion ==
From the 2000 census, 11 or 6.1% were Roman Catholic, while 143 or 79.9% belonged to the Swiss Reformed Church. Of the rest of the population, there were 24 individuals (or about 13.41% of the population) who belonged to another Christian church. 9 (or about 5.03% of the population) belonged to no church, are agnostic or atheist, and 4 individuals (or about 2.23% of the population) did not answer the question.

== Education ==
In Lurtigen about 82 or (45.8%) of the population have completed non-mandatory upper secondary education, and 22 or (12.3%) have completed additional higher education at university. Of the 22 who completed tertiary schooling, 63.6% were Swiss men, 36.4% were Swiss women.

The Canton of Fribourg school system provides one year of non-obligatory Kindergarten, followed by six years of Primary school. This is followed by three years of obligatory lower Secondary school, where the students are separated according to ability and aptitude. Following the lower Secondary, students may attend a three or four year optional upper Secondary school. The upper Secondary school is divided into gymnase (university preparatory) and vocational programs. After they finish the upper Secondary program, students may choose to attend a Tertiary school or continue their apprenticeship.

During the 2010–11 school year, there were a total of 24 students attending one class in Lurtigen. A total of 35 students from the municipality attended any school, either in the municipality or outside of it. There were no kindergarten classes in the municipality, but 3 students attended kindergarten in a neighboring municipality. The municipality had one primary class and 24 students. During the same year, there were no lower secondary classes in the municipality, but 8 students attended lower secondary school in a neighboring municipality. There were no upper Secondary classes or vocational classes, but there were 3 upper Secondary students and one upper Secondary vocational student who attended classes in another municipality. The municipality had no non-university Tertiary classes, but there were 4 non-university Tertiary students and one specialized Tertiary student who attended classes in another municipality.

As of 2000, there were 13 students in Lurtigen who came from another municipality, while 19 residents attended schools outside the municipality.
