= Villarepos =

- Former municipality
- Coat of arms
- Location of Villarepos
- Location within Switzerland Location within Canton of Fribourg
- Coordinates: 46°53′N 7°4′E
- Country: Switzerland
- Canton: Fribourg
- District: See

Government
  - Executive: Conseil communal with 5 members
  - Mayor: Syndic

Area
  - Total: 4.74 km^{2} (1.83 sq mi)
- Elevation: 493 m (1,617 ft)

Population (Dec 2015)
  - Total: 611
  - Density: 129/km^{2} (334/sq mi)
- Time zone: UTC+01:00 (CET)
  - Summer (DST): UTC+02:00 (CEST)
- Postal code: 1583
- SFOS number: 2279
- ISO 3166 code: CH-FR
- Surrounded by: Avenches (VD), Clavaleyres (BE), Courgevaux, Courlevon, Donatyre (VD), Faoug (VD), Misery-Courtion, Wallenried
- Website: www.villarepos.ch

Villarepos (Arpitan: Velâr-Repôs [vəlɑʁɛˈpu]; German: Ruppertswil) is a former municipality in the district of See in the canton of Fribourg in Switzerland. In 2017 the former municipalities of Villarepos, Barberêche and Wallenried merged into the municipality of Courtepin.

== History ==
Villarepos is first mentioned in 1332 as Villarepot. The municipality was formerly known by its German name Ruppertswil, however, that name is rarely used.

== Geography ==
Villarepos had an area of 4.76 km^{2} (1.84 sq mi). Of this area, 2.74 km^{2} (1.06 mi^{2}) or 57.6% is used for agricultural purposes, while 1.6 km^{2} (0.62 mi^{2}) or 33.6% is forested. Of the rest of the land, 0.38 km^{2} (0.15 mi^{2}) or 8.0% is settled (buildings or roads).

Of the built up area, housing and buildings made up 4.6% and transportation infrastructure made up 1.5%. Power and water infrastructure as well as other special developed areas made up 1.5% of the area Out of the forested land, 30.7% of the total land area is heavily forested and 2.9% is covered with orchards or small clusters of trees. Of the agricultural land, 32.6% is used for growing crops and 23.1% is pastures, while 1.9% is used for orchards or vine crops.

The former municipality is located in the See/Lac district. It consists of the villages of Villarepos and Chandossel along with the hamlet of Plan. On 1 January 1983 the former municipality of Chandossel merged into the municipality of Villarepos.

== Coat of arms ==
The blazon of the municipal coat of arms is Gules a Tower embattled Argent behind a Boar salient Or armed of the second.

== Demographics ==
Villarepos had a population (as of 2015) of 611. As of 2008, 6.3% of the population are resident foreign nationals. Over the last 10 years (2000–2010) the population has changed at a rate of 21.9%. Migration accounted for 27.9%, while births and deaths accounted for 2.7%.

Most of the population (as of 2000) speaks French (355 or 78.4%) as their first language, German is the second most common (88 or 19.4%) and English is the third (6 or 1.3%).

As of 2008, the population was 50.3% male and 49.7% female. The population was made up of 254 Swiss men (47.1% of the population) and 17 (3.2%) non-Swiss men. There were 250 Swiss women (46.4%) and 18 (3.3%) non-Swiss women. Of the population in the municipality, 161 or about 35.5% were born in Villarepos and lived there in 2000. There were 118 or 26.0% who were born in the same canton, while 131 or 28.9% were born somewhere else in Switzerland, and 26 or 5.7% were born outside of Switzerland.

As of 2000, children and teenagers (0–19 years old) make up 24.7% of the population, while adults (20–64 years old) make up 58.9% and seniors (over 64 years old) make up 16.3%.

As of 2000, there were 195 people who were single and never married in the municipality. There were 220 married individuals, 26 widows or widowers and 12 individuals who are divorced.

As of 2000, there were 187 private households in the municipality, and an average of 2.4 persons per household. There were 58 households that consist of only one person and 12 households with five or more people. In 2000, a total of 174 apartments (83.7% of the total) were permanently occupied, while 27 apartments (13.0%) were seasonally occupied and 7 apartments (3.4%) were empty. As of 2009, the construction rate of new housing units was 7.3 new units per 1000 residents. The vacancy rate for the municipality, in 2010, was 2.5%.

The historical population is given in the following chart:

== Politics ==
In the 2011 federal election the most popular party was the SVP which received 24.3% of the vote. The next three most popular parties were the SPS (21.6%), the CVP (15.3%) and the FDP (13.8%).

The SVP received about the same percentage of the vote as they did in the 2007 Federal election (23.3% in 2007 vs 24.3% in 2011). The SPS moved from fourth in 2007 (with 17.3%) to second in 2011, the CVP moved from second in 2007 (with 22.5%) to third and the FDP moved from third in 2007 (with 18.7%) to fourth. A total of 165 votes were cast in this election, of which 2 or 1.2% were invalid.

== Economy ==
As of 2010, Villarepos had an unemployment rate of 3.8%. As of 2008, there were 30 people employed in the primary economic sector and about 10 businesses involved in this sector. 7 people were employed in the secondary sector and there were 3 businesses in this sector. 24 people were employed in the tertiary sector, with 8 businesses in this sector. There were 232 residents of the municipality who were employed in some capacity, of which females made up 44.4% of the workforce.

In 2008 the total number of full-time equivalent jobs was 46. The number of jobs in the primary sector was 18, all of which were in agriculture. The number of jobs in the secondary sector was 6, all of which were in manufacturing. The number of jobs in the tertiary sector was 22. In the tertiary sector; 2 or 9.1% were in wholesale or retail sales or the repair of motor vehicles, 1 was in the movement and storage of goods, 7 or 31.8% were in a hotel or restaurant and 2 were in education.

In 2000, there were 15 workers who commuted into the municipality and 170 workers who commuted away. The municipality is a net exporter of workers, with about 11.3 workers leaving the municipality for every one entering. Of the working population, 2.6% used public transportation to get to work, and 74.6% used a private car.

== Religion ==
From the 2000 census, 270 or 59.6% were Roman Catholic, while 105 or 23.2% belonged to the Swiss Reformed Church. Of the rest of the population, there was 1 member of an Orthodox church, and there were 18 individuals (or about 3.97% of the population) who belonged to another Christian church. There was 1 individual who was Islamic. 47 (or about 10.38% of the population) belonged to no church, are agnostic or atheist, and 20 individuals (or about 4.42% of the population) did not answer the question.

== Education ==
In Villarepos about 159 or (35.1%) of the population have completed non-mandatory upper secondary education, and 42 or (9.3%) have completed additional higher education (either university or a Fachhochschule). Of the 42 who completed tertiary schooling, 71.4% were Swiss men, 21.4% were Swiss women.

The Canton of Fribourg school system provides one year of non-obligatory Kindergarten, followed by six years of Primary school. This is followed by three years of obligatory lower Secondary school where the students are separated according to ability and aptitude. Following the lower Secondary students may attend a three or four year optional upper Secondary school. The upper Secondary school is divided into gymnasium (university preparatory) and vocational programs. After they finish the upper Secondary program, students may choose to attend a Tertiary school or continue their apprenticeship.

During the 2010-11 school year, there were a total of 24 students attending 2 classes in Villarepos. A total of 83 students from the municipality attended any school, either in the municipality or outside of it. There were 2 kindergarten classes with a total of 24 students in the municipality. The municipality had no primary school classes, but 49 students attended primary school in a neighboring municipality. During the same year, there were no lower secondary classes in the municipality, but 16 students attended lower secondary school in a neighboring municipality. There were no upper Secondary classes or vocational classes, but there was one upper Secondary student and 7 upper Secondary vocational students who attended classes in another municipality. The municipality had no non-university Tertiary classes, but there was one non-university Tertiary student and 2 specialized Tertiary students who attended classes in another municipality.

As of 2000, there were 4 students in Villarepos who came from another municipality, while 29 residents attended schools outside the municipality.
