= Courlevon =

- Former municipality
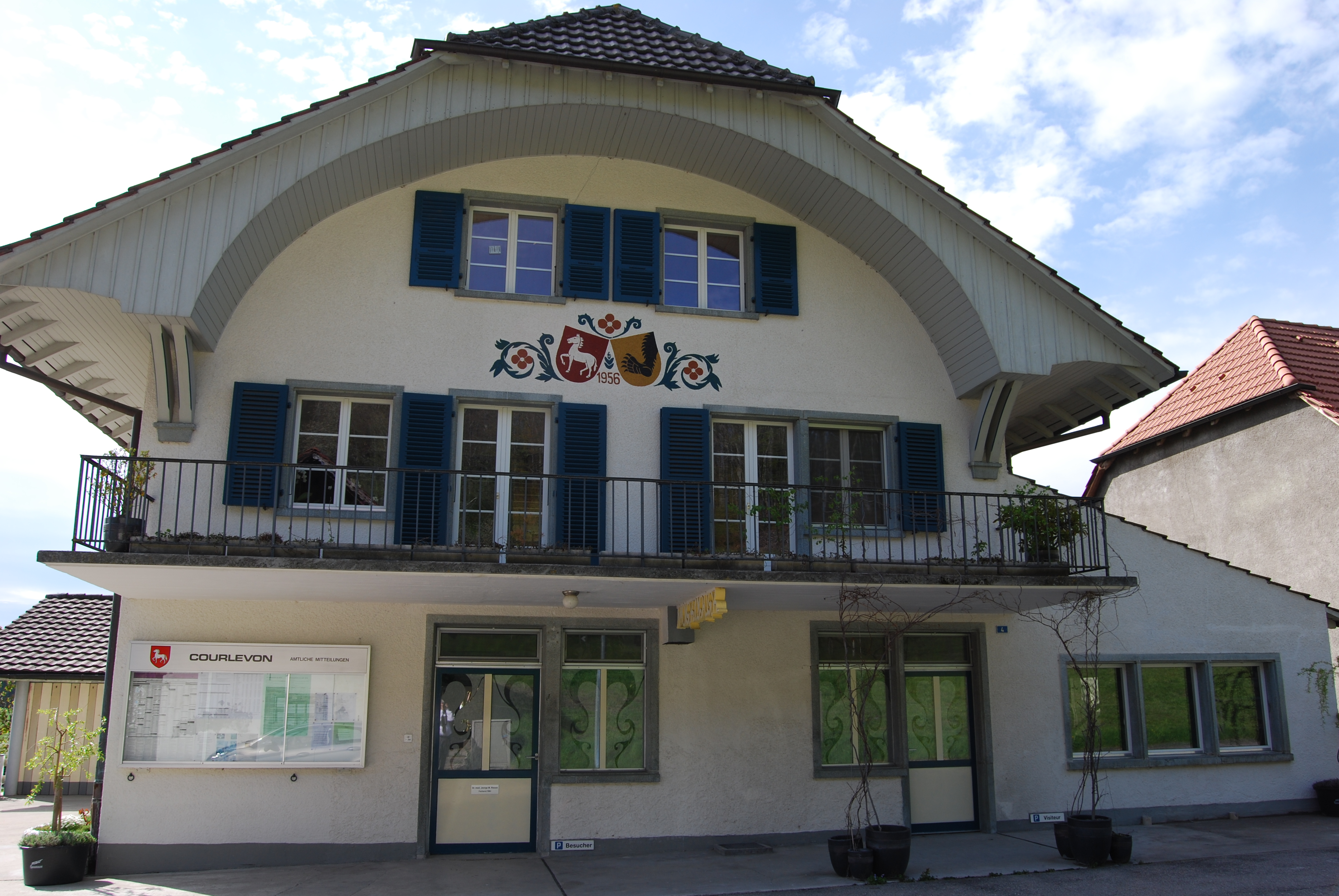

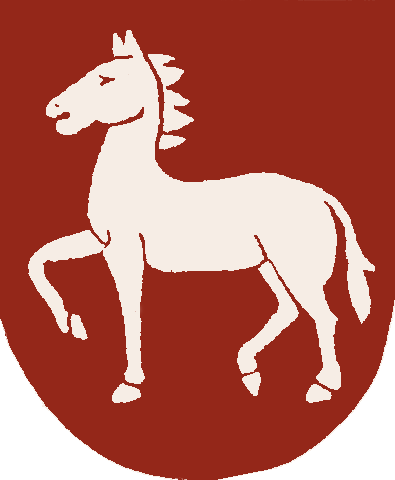
- Coat of arms
- Location of Courlevon
- Location within Switzerland Location within Canton of Fribourg
- Coordinates: 46°53′N 7°7′E
- Country: Switzerland
- Canton: Fribourg
- District: See or du Lac

Government
  - Executive: Gemeinderat with 5 members
  - Mayor: Ammann

Area
  - Total: 3.27 km^{2} (1.26 sq mi)
- Elevation: 556 m (1,824 ft)

Population (Dec 2014)
  - Total: 305
  - Density: 93.3/km^{2} (242/sq mi)
- Time zone: UTC+01:00 (CET)
  - Summer (DST): UTC+02:00 (CEST)
- Postal code: 1795
- SFOS number: 2251
- ISO 3166 code: CH-FR
- Localities: Courlevon, Coussiberlé
- Surrounded by: Courgevaux, Cressier, Münchenwiler (BE), Villarepos, Wallenried
- Website: www.courlevon.ch

Courlevon is a former municipality in the district of See or du Lac in the canton of Fribourg in Switzerland. On 1 January 2016, the former municipalities of Courlevon, Jeuss, Lurtigen, and Salvenach merged into Murten/Morat.

== History ==
Courlevon is first mentioned in 1214 as Curlivin.

== Geography ==
Courlevon had an area, as of 2009, of 3.3 square kilometres (1.3 mi^{2}). Of this area, 1.87 km^{2} (0.72 mi^{2}) or 57.4% is used for agricultural purposes, while 1.23 km^{2} (0.47 mi^{2}) or 37.7% is forested. Of the rest of the land, 0.17 km^{2} (0.066 mi^{2}) or 5.2% is settled (buildings or roads).

Of the built up area, housing and buildings made up 4.3% and transportation infrastructure made up 0.6%. Out of the forested land, 35.6% of the total land area is heavily forested and 2.1% is covered with orchards or small clusters of trees. Of the agricultural land, 42.9% is used for growing crops and 13.8% is pastures.

The former municipality is located in the See/Lac district. On 15 February 1974, the former municipality of Coussiberlé merged into the municipality of Courlevon.

== Coat of arms ==
The blazon of the municipal coat of arms is Gules, a Horse passant Argent.

== Demographics ==
Courlevon had a population (as of 2014) of 305. As of 2008, 9.1% of the population are resident foreign nationals. Over the last 10 years (2000–2010) the population has changed at a rate of 17.6%. Migration accounted for 21.2%, while births and deaths accounted for −1.2%.

It is a German-speaking former municipality in the mostly French speaking Canton of Fribourg. Most of the population (as of 2000) speaks German (240 or 92.7%) as their first language, French is the second most common (12 or 4.6%) and Portuguese is the third (3 or 1.2%). There is 1 person who speaks Italian.

As of 2008, the population was 47.8% male and 52.2% female. The population was made up of 126 Swiss men (43.6% of the population) and 12 (4.2%) non-Swiss men. There were 134 Swiss women (46.4%) and 17 (5.9%) non-Swiss women. Of the population in the municipality, 110 or about 42.5% were born in Courlevon and lived there in 2000. There were 60 or 23.2% who were born in the same canton, while 63 or 24.3% were born somewhere else in Switzerland, and 19 or 7.3% were born outside of Switzerland.

As of 2000, children and teenagers (0–19 years old) make up 25.1% of the population, while adults (20–64 years old) make up 59.8% and seniors (over 64 years old) make up 15.1%.

As of 2000, there were 104 people who were single and never married in the municipality. There were 136 married individuals, 11 widows or widowers and 8 individuals who are divorced.

As of 2000, there were 105 private households in the municipality, and an average of 2.4 persons per household. There were 31 households that consist of only one person and 4 households with five or more people. In 2000, a total of 104 apartments (96.3% of the total) were permanently occupied, while 1 apartment was seasonally occupied and 3 apartments (2.8%) were empty. As of 2009, the construction rate of new housing units was 10.2 new units per 1000 residents.

The historical population is given in the following chart:

== Politics ==
In the 2011 federal election, the most popular party was the SVP which received 28.6% of the vote. The next three most popular parties were the SPS (19.8%), the CVP (13.0%) and the FDP (9.6%).

The SVP received about the same percentage of the vote as they did in the 2007 Federal election (29.1% in 2007 vs 28.6% in 2011). The SPS retained about the same popularity (18.7% in 2007), the CVP retained about the same popularity (16.6% in 2007) and the FDP retained about the same popularity (13.4% in 2007). A total of 108 votes were cast in this election.

== Economy ==
As of 2010, Courlevon had an unemployment rate of 1%. As of 2008, there were 26 people employed in the primary economic sector and about 9 businesses involved in this sector. 14 people were employed in the secondary sector and there were 4 businesses in this sector. 5 people were employed in the tertiary sector, with 2 businesses in this sector. There were 144 residents of the municipality who were employed in some capacity, of which females made up 43.1% of the workforce.

In 2008 the total number of full-time equivalent jobs was 33. The number of jobs in the primary sector was 18, all of which were in agriculture. The number of jobs in the secondary sector was 12 of which 9 or (75.0%) were in manufacturing and 3 (25.0%) were in construction. The number of jobs in the tertiary sector was 3, of which 2 were in a hotel or restaurant.

In 2000, there were 7 workers who commuted into the municipality and 100 workers who commuted away. The municipality is a net exporter of workers, with about 14.3 workers leaving the municipality for every one entering. Of the working population, 6.9% used public transportation to get to work, and 66.7% used a private car.

== Religion ==
From the 2000 census, 54 or 20.8% were Roman Catholic, while 167 or 64.5% belonged to the Swiss Reformed Church. Of the rest of the population, there was 1 member of an Orthodox church, and there were 4 individuals (or about 1.54% of the population) who belonged to another Christian church. There was 1 individual who was Islamic. 27 (or about 10.42% of the population) belonged to no church, are agnostic or atheist, and 7 individuals (or about 2.70% of the population) did not answer the question.

== Education ==
In Courlevon about 101 or (39.0%) of the population have completed non-mandatory upper secondary education, and 29 or (11.2%) have completed additional higher education (either university or a Fachhochschule). Of the 29 who completed tertiary schooling, 69.0% were Swiss men, 20.7% were Swiss women.

The Canton of Fribourg school system provides one year of non-obligatory Kindergarten, followed by six years of Primary school. This is followed by three years of obligatory lower Secondary school where the students are separated according to ability and aptitude. Following the lower Secondary students may attend a three- or four-year optional upper Secondary school. The upper Secondary school is divided into gymnasium (university preparatory) and vocational programs. After they finish the upper Secondary program, students may choose to attend a Tertiary school or continue their apprenticeship.

During the 2010–11 school year, there were no students attending school in Courlevon, but a total of 45 students attended school in other municipalities. Of these students, 6 were in kindergarten, 10 were in a primary school, 15 were in a mandatory secondary school, one was in an upper secondary school and 11 were in a vocational secondary program. There were a total of 2 tertiary students from Courlevon.

As of 2000, there was one student in Courlevon who came from another municipality, while 41 residents attended schools outside the municipality.
