= Cressier, Fribourg =

Cressier
- Municipality
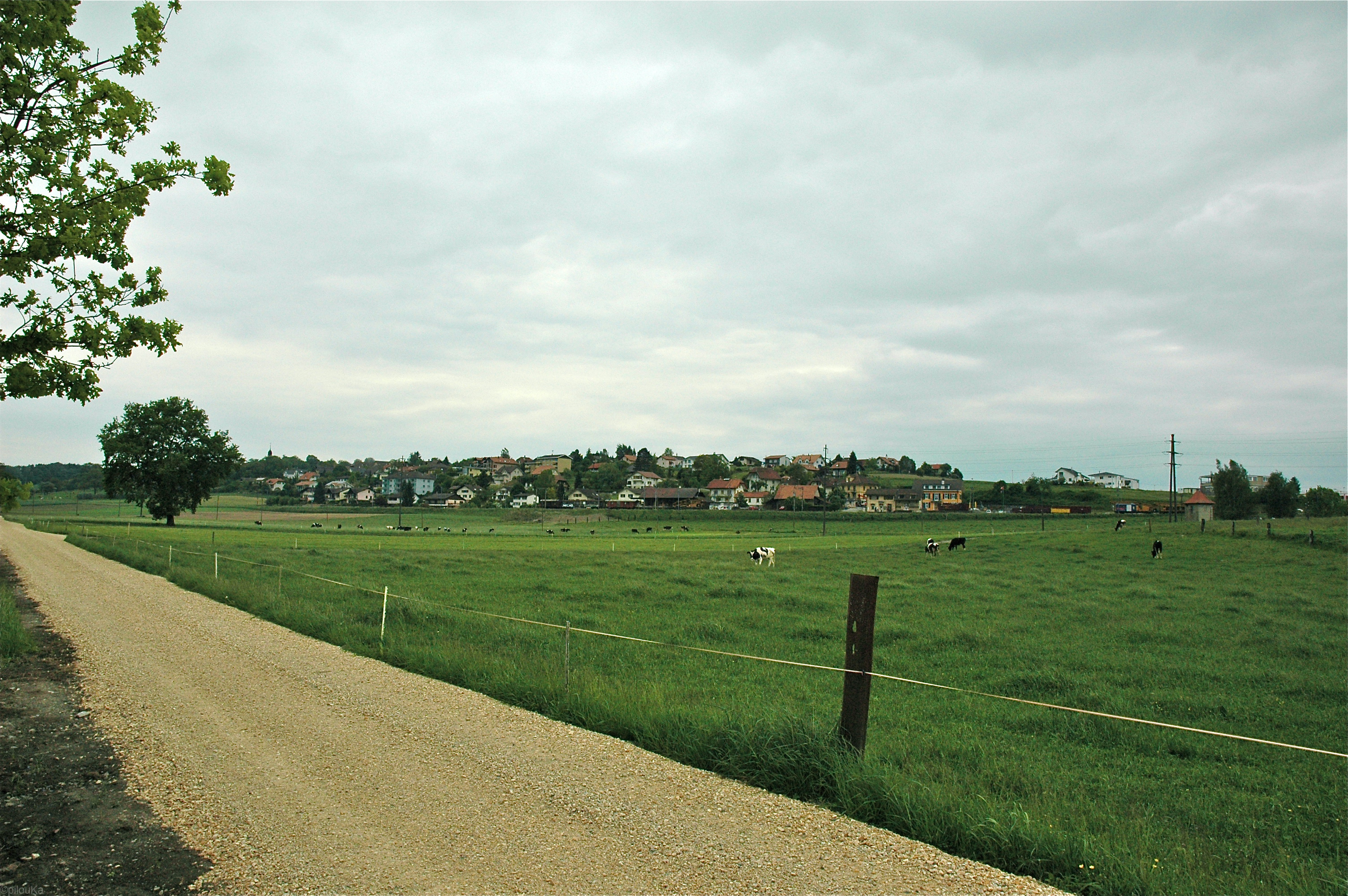
- Cressier village

- Flag Coat of arms
- Location of Cressier
- Location within Switzerland Location within Canton of Fribourg
- Coordinates: 46°54′N 7°8′E
- Country: Switzerland
- Canton: Fribourg
- District: See or du Lac

Government
  - Executive: Conseil communal with 7 members
  - Mayor: Syndic

Area
  - Total: 4.16 km^{2} (1.61 sq mi)
- Elevation: 569 m (1,867 ft)

Population (December 2020)
  - Total: 1,015
  - Density: 244/km^{2} (632/sq mi)
- Time zone: UTC+01:00 (CET)
  - Summer (DST): UTC+02:00 (CEST)
- Postal code: 1785
- SFOS number: 2257
- ISO 3166 code: CH-FR
- Surrounded by: Courlevon, Gurmels, Jeuss, Münchenwiler (BE), Salvenach, Wallenried
- Website: www.cressier.ch

Cressier (French: [kʁɛsje]; Arpitan: Cressiér, pronounced [kʁəˈsi] or [kʁəˈʃi]) is a municipality in the district of See or du Lac in the canton of Fribourg in Switzerland.

== History ==
Cressier is first mentioned in 1080 as Crisei. The municipality was formerly known by its German name Grissach, however, that name is no longer used.

== Geography ==
Cressier has an area, as of 2009, of 4.2 square kilometers (1.6 mi^{2}). Of this area, 2.88 km^{2} (1.11 mi^{2}) or 69.1% is used for agricultural purposes, while 0.81 km^{2} (0.31 mi^{2}) or 19.4% is forested. Of the rest of the land, 0.45 km^{2} (0.17 mi^{2}) or 10.8% is settled (buildings or roads), 0.01 km^{2} (2.5 acres) or 0.2% is either rivers or lakes.

Of the built up area, industrial buildings made up 1.4% of the total area while housing and buildings made up 4.8% and transportation infrastructure made up 4.3%. Out of the forested land, 17.7% of the total land area is heavily forested and 1.7% is covered with orchards or small clusters of trees. Of the agricultural land, 56.6% is used for growing crops and 10.1% is pastures, while 2.4% is used for orchards or vine crops. All the water in the municipality is flowing water.

The municipality is located in the See/Lac district.

== Coat of arms ==
The blazon of the municipal coat of arms is Sable, a Horse Argent trotting harnessed Or.

== Demographics ==
Cressier has a population (as of December 2020) of 1,015. As of 2008, 22.1% of the population are resident foreign nationals. Over the last 10 years (2000–2010) the population has changed at a rate of 14.3%. Migration accounted for 11.1%, while births and deaths accounted for 5.3%.

Most of the population (as of 2000) speaks French (394 or 54.0%) as their first language, German is the second most common (292 or 40.1%) and Portuguese is the third (14 or 1.9%). There are 5 people who speak Italian.

As of 2008, the population was 51.3% male and 48.7% female. The population was made up of 336 Swiss men (40.0% of the population) and 95 (11.3%) non-Swiss men. There were 318 Swiss women (37.9%) and 91 (10.8%) non-Swiss women. Of the population in the municipality, 196 or about 26.9% were born in Cressier and lived there in 2000. There were 226 or 31.0% who were born in the same canton, while 178 or 24.4% were born somewhere else in Switzerland, and 108 or 14.8% were born outside of Switzerland.

As of 2000, children and teenagers (0–19 years old) make up 27% of the population, while adults (20–64 years old) make up 62.1% and seniors (over 64 years old) make up 10.8%.

As of 2000, there were 327 people who were single and never married in the municipality. There were 337 married individuals, 30 widows or widowers and 35 individuals who are divorced.

As of 2000, there were 298 private households in the municipality, and an average of 2.4 persons per household. There were 85 households that consist of only one person and 22 households with five or more people. In 2000, a total of 273 apartments (87.5% of the total) were permanently occupied, while 36 apartments (11.5%) were seasonally occupied and 3 apartments (1.0%) were empty.

Historical population

Year	Pop.	±% p.a.
1811	211	—
1831	359	+2.69%
1850	326	−0.51%
1860	335	+0.27%
1870	371	+1.03%
1880	343	−0.78%

Year	Pop.	±% p.a.
1888	369	+0.92%
1900	350	−0.44%
1910	377	+0.75%
1920	384	+0.18%
1930	370	−0.37%
1941	372	+0.05%

Year	Pop.	±% p.a.
1950	395	+0.67%
1960	448	+1.27%
1970	437	−0.25%
1980	410	−0.64%
1990	508	+2.17%
2000	729	+3.68%

== Heritage sites of national significance ==
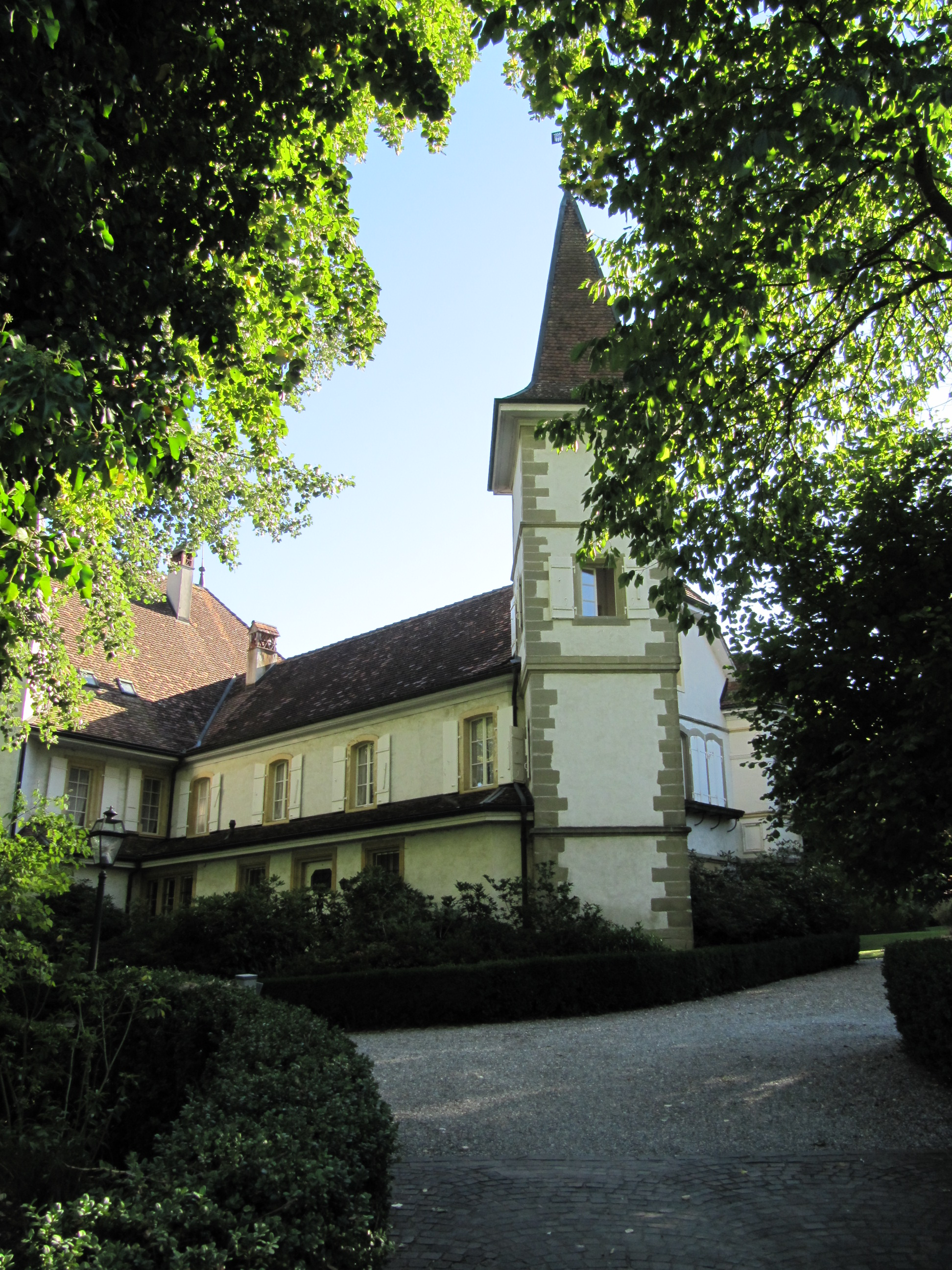
Mansion de Reynold

The Mansion De Reynold is listed as a Swiss heritage site of national significance. The entire village of Cressier is part of the Inventory of Swiss Heritage Sites.

== Politics ==
In the 2011 federal election the most popular party was the SPS which received 27.0% of the vote. The next three most popular parties were the SVP (19.3%), the CVP (14.6%) and the FDP (10.3%).

The SPS improved their position in Cressier rising to first, from second in 2007 (with 22.1%) The SVP moved from third in 2007 (with 20.6%) to second in 2011, the CVP moved from first in 2007 (with 22.1%) to third and the FDP moved from below fourth place in 2007 to fourth. A total of 274 votes were cast in this election.

== Economy ==
As of 2010, Cressier had an unemployment rate of 2.2%. As of 2008, there were 17 people employed in the primary economic sector and about 7 businesses involved in this sector. 439 people were employed in the secondary sector and there were 9 businesses in this sector. 99 people were employed in the tertiary sector, with 25 businesses in this sector. There were 398 residents of the municipality who were employed in some capacity, of which females made up 43.2% of the workforce.

In 2008 the total number of full-time equivalent jobs was 475. The number of jobs in the primary sector was 13, all of which were in agriculture. The number of jobs in the secondary sector was 385 of which 358 or (93.0%) were in manufacturing and 6 (1.6%) were in construction. The number of jobs in the tertiary sector was 77. In the tertiary sector; 46 or 59.7% were in wholesale or retail sales or the repair of motor vehicles, 7 or 9.1% were in the movement and storage of goods, 7 or 9.1% were in a hotel or restaurant, 2 or 2.6% were technical professionals or scientists, 5 or 6.5% were in education.

In 2000, there were 378 workers who commuted into the municipality and 299 workers who commuted away. The municipality is a net importer of workers, with about 1.3 workers entering the municipality for every one leaving. Of the working population, 16.1% used public transportation to get to work, and 67.1% used a private car.

== Religion ==
From the 2000 census, 426 or 58.4% were Roman Catholic, while 183 or 25.1% belonged to the Swiss Reformed Church. Of the rest of the population, there were 2 members of an Orthodox church (or about 0.27% of the population), and there were 80 individuals (or about 10.97% of the population) who belonged to another Christian church. There were 8 (or about 1.10% of the population) who were Islamic. There was 1 person who was Hindu. 58 (or about 7.96% of the population) belonged to no church, are agnostic or atheist, and 11 individuals (or about 1.51% of the population) did not answer the question.

== Education ==
In Cressier about 263 or (36.1%) of the population have completed non-mandatory upper secondary education, and 109 or (15.0%) have completed additional higher education (either university or a Fachhochschule). Of the 109 who completed tertiary schooling, 61.5% were Swiss men, 19.3% were Swiss women, 11.0% were non-Swiss men and 8.3% were non-Swiss women.

The Canton of Fribourg school system provides one year of non-obligatory Kindergarten, followed by six years of Primary school. This is followed by three years of obligatory lower Secondary school where the students are separated according to ability and aptitude. Following the lower Secondary students may attend a three or four year optional upper Secondary school. The upper Secondary school is divided into gymnasium (university preparatory) and vocational programs. After they finish the upper Secondary program, students may choose to attend a Tertiary school or continue their apprenticeship.

During the 2010–11 school year, there were a total of 75 students attending 5 classes in Cressier. A total of 153 students from the municipality attended any school, either in the municipality or outside of it. There was one kindergarten class with a total of 14 students in the municipality. The municipality had 4 primary classes and 61 students. During the same year, there were no lower secondary classes in the municipality, but 37 students attended lower secondary school in a neighboring municipality. There were no upper Secondary classes or vocational classes, but there were 20 upper Secondary students and 18 upper Secondary vocational students who attended classes in another municipality. The municipality had no non-university Tertiary classes, but there were 2 specialized Tertiary students who attended classes in another municipality.

As of 2000, there were 7 students in Cressier who came from another municipality, while 57 residents attended schools outside the municipality.

== Transportation ==
The municipality has a railway station, Cressier FR, on the Fribourg–Ins line. It has regular service to Fribourg/Freiburg, Ins, and Neuchâtel.
