= Münchenwiler Castle =

Münchenwiler Castle / Château de Villars-les-Moines
- Schloss Münchenwiler (German)
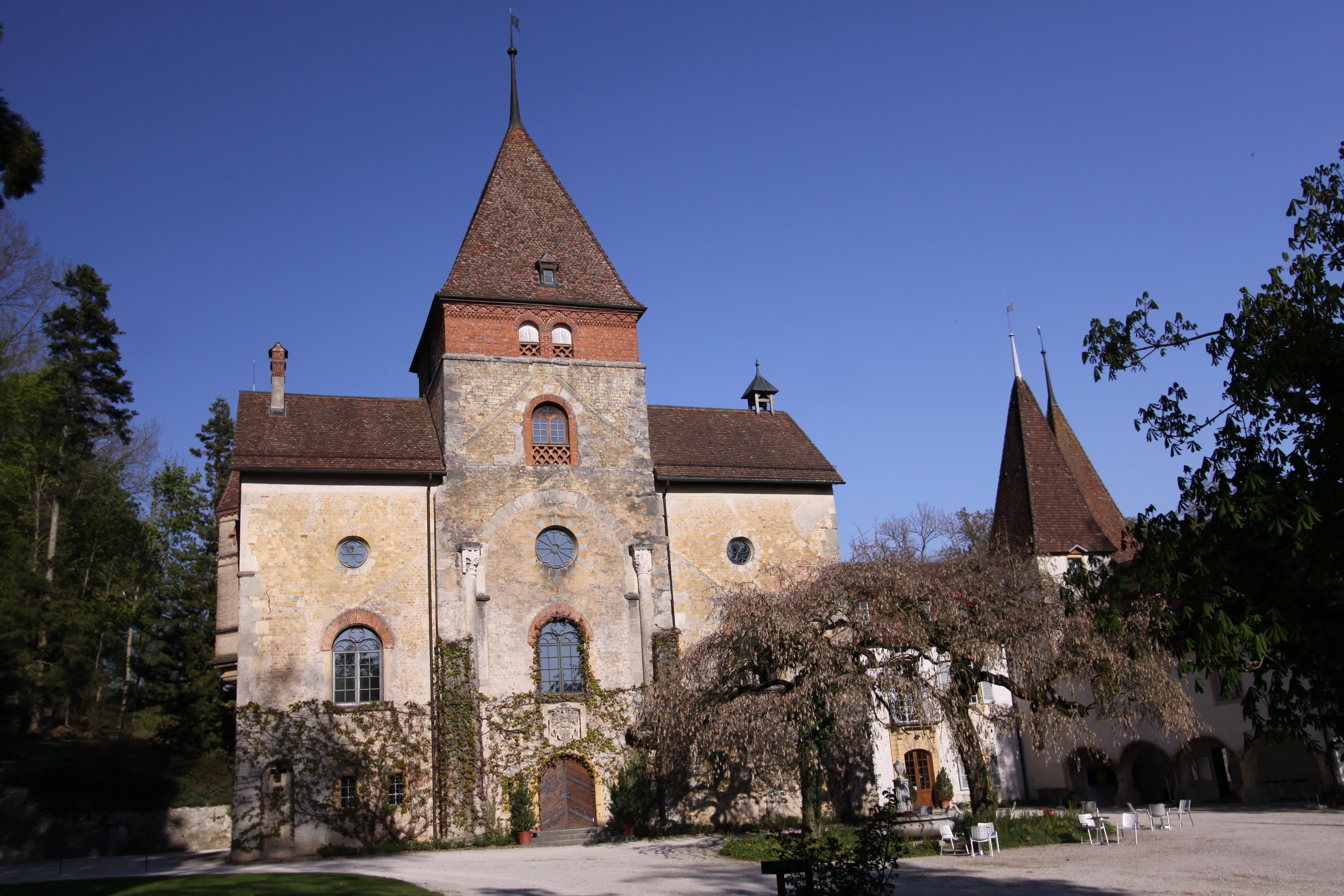

- Location within Switzerland
- 46.912157°N 7.126946°E
- Location: Münchenwiler

History
- Built: 1100
- Rebuilt: 1535-37

Swiss Cultural Property of National Significance

Münchenwiler Castle or Château de Villars-les-Moines is a castle and former Cluniac priory in the municipality of Münchenwiler of the Canton of Bern in Switzerland. It is a Swiss heritage site of national significance.

== History ==
In 1080-81 the village was given by the brothers Gerold and Rudolf de Vilar to Cluny Abbey. Shortly thereafter a priory was founded, which served as a way station for pilgrims on the Way of St. James. The Priory church was built in 1100, using spolia from the Roman ruins at Avenches. The small priory community normally consisted of a prior and two to four monks. The priory suffered during the local wars of the 14th and 15th centuries. It was damaged during the Battle of Laupen in 1339. Over a century later, in 1448, it was damaged again during the Freiburgkrieg between the emergent city-states of Bern and Fribourg. In 1476 it was damaged a third time during the Burgundian Wars. During the 15th century, the small priory began to lose importance until the office of prior was reduced to a title without power. In 1484, by papal decree, leadership of the priory was transferred to the college of canons of the Munster of Bern. In 1528, Bern adopted the Protestant Reformation. Despite resistance from Fribourg, in 1530 Bern was able to retain control and secularize Münchenwiler.

In 1535 Bern sold the Herrschaft of Münchenwiler to the former Bernese Schultheiss Hans Jakob von Wattenwyl. Over the next two years, under von Wattenwyl, portions of the priory church and priory buildings were converted into a castle. It remained with the von Wattenwyl family until 1612. For the next fifty years it passed through several owners, before the von Graffenried family acquired it in 1668 and held it until 1932. The castle was expanded in 1690 and again in the 19th century. A new chapel was added to the castle in 1886. Following the 1798 French invasion, Münchenwiler became part of the Helvetic Republic in the short lived Canton of Sarine et Broye. Under the new Republic, the castle's lands were transferred to the municipality. The von Graffenried family became impoverished in the early 20th century and in 1922 they began to sell some of their property in the area. In 1932 they sold the castle and its remaining park land to a consortium from Neuchâtel. In 1943 the consortium sold it to the Canton of Bern, who converted it into a community Hochschule. Later it became an adult education school before being renovated and converted into a hotel and convention center in 1986-90.

== See also ==
- List of castles in Switzerland
