= Anti-Racist Action =

North American far-left political cells

- Abbreviation: ARA
- Nickname: ARA
- Formation: January 14, 1989; 37 years ago (as Anti-Racist Action); December 14, 2013; 12 years ago (as Torch Network)
- Founders: Kieran Frazier Knutson; Mic Crenshaw
- Founded at: Minneapolis, Minnesota, US
- Type: Far-left militant cells
- Purpose: Anti-racism; Anti-fascism; Internal factions Anarchism (majority); Trotskyism (minority); Maoism (minority)
- Location(s): United States and Canada
- Methods: Political violence Direct action Doxxing
- Affiliations: One People's Project; IWW General Defense Committee; Anarchist Black Cross Skinheads Against Racial Prejudice; Support Prisoner Resistance; International Anti-Fascist Defence Fund
- Website: Anti-RacistAction.org (no longer updated)

Anti-Racist Action (ARA), also known as the Anti-Racist Action Network and later the Torch Network, is a decentralized network of militant far-left political cells in the United States and Canada. The ARA network originated in the late 1980s to engage in direct action, including political violence and doxxing against rival political organizations on the hard far-right, mainly violent groups of neo-Nazi skinheads, to dissuade them from further involvement in political activities. Anti-Racist Action described such groups as racist or fascist, or both. Most ARA members have been anarchists, but some have been Trotskyists and Maoists.

The network originated among the hardcore punk skinhead scene in Minnesota among a group known as the Minneapolis Baldies which had been founded in 1987. The network grew and spread throughout North America. The Midwestern United States, particularly the cities of Minneapolis, Chicago and Columbus, were the main hotspot for activity, but notable chapters existed in Portland, Los Angeles, Toronto and elsewhere.

In the early 1990s, the Anti-Racist Action Network began to organize an annual conference, attended by representatives of the official chapters, along with prospective members. These events often feature guest speakers and hardcore punk bands. In the late 1990s, the network was affiliated with a short-lived international grouping which called itself the Militant Anti-Fascist Network and consisted of mostly Europe-based groups such as the UK-based Anti-Fascist Action and various German Antifa factions among others.

== History ==
=== Origins in Minneapolis hardcore punk scene ===
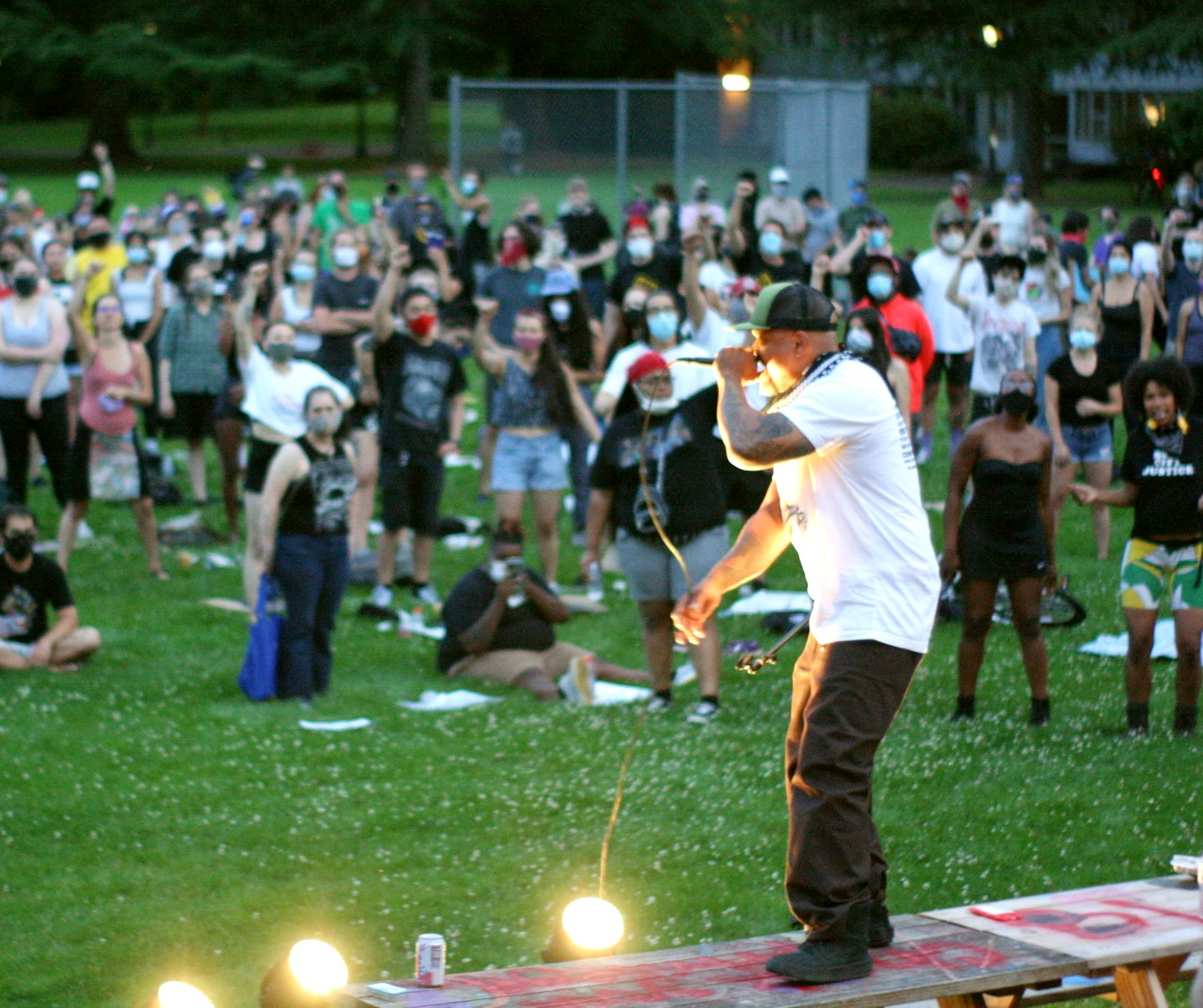
Mic Crenshaw, performing in 2020. Along with Kieran Knutson and Jason "Gator" Nevilles, he was one of the founding members of ARA from the earliest Minneapolis Baldies days.

Anti-Racist Action originated from the hardcore punk subculture in the United States at Minneapolis, Minnesota, among suburban mostly White American teenagers during the late 1980s. The wider punk subculture had flirted with extreme political symbolism, as a form of "shock value" from its early days, including anarchist, communist and Nazi symbols, though many did not take this seriously. Eventually some bands such as Crass in the United Kingdom began to more seriously integrate an anarcho-communist political ideology into their music and associated anarcho-punk subculture.

This spread to the United States and had a strong influence on the Minneapolis hardcore scene. Some of the people involved in this scene created a skinhead street gang, inspired by Nick Knight's book Skinhead, known as the Minneapolis Baldies. The Baldies, who formed in 1986 and regarded themselves as leftist, anti-racist skinheads, frequently engaged in political violence with rival far-right skinheads in Uptown.

The Baldies were associated with bands such as Blind Approach, while their rivals from the East Side, the White Knights, were associated with Mass Corruption. According to Kieran Knutson, they organized a demonstration with the University of Minnesota Black Law Student Association, including Keith Ellison who later became the Democratic Party's Attorney General of Minnesota.

In May 1989, Chicago skinheads formed their own Anti-Racist Action (ARA). Chicago ARA activists fought with the neo-Nazi skinheads of Chicago Area SkinHeads (CASH). A group called Skinheads of Chicago (SHOC) consisted mostly of black skinheads and adhered to left-wing and black power politics. In 1989, some of them featured on The Oprah Winfrey Show, opposing CASH who were guests.

People in the hardcore punk scene became more widely aware of ARA across America due to a nationwide magazine called Maximum Rock and Roll (MRR), edited by the counter-culture influencer Tim Yohannan who worked at University of California, Berkeley, which started to promote them from 1987 onwards. At a meeting in Minneapolis on January 14, 1989, with 80 or more anti-racist skinheads from Milwaukee, Kansas, Iowa, Kansas, Nebraska and Ohio, they founded a network called "the Syndicate". Other chapters in attendance included the Brew City Skins from Milwaukee, the North Side Crew also in Chicago, and groups in Cincinnati (people associated with SHARP), Indianapolis, Lawrence and elsewhere.

=== 1990s spread beyond the Midwest ===
From the late 1980s into the 1990s, the network began to grow. One of their main rallying points was in relation to the trials of Tom Metzger, a neo-Nazi activist associated then with a group calling itself the White Aryan Resistance (WAR). Metzger, originally a "suit-and-tie" far-right talkshow show host, had begun to play a significant role in the creation of a neo-Nazi skinhead subculture in the United States, inspired in part by Ian Stuart Donaldson of Skrewdriver. Many British skinheads like him also joined groups such as the British Movement. This growing network of neo-Nazi skinheads in the United States were in conflict with the far-left leaning skinheads associated with Anti-Racist Action for control of the scene.

In 1988, some of Metzger's skinhead followers in Portland belonging to East Side White Pride killed an Ethiopian student, Mulugeta Seraw, and were charged. Metzger was sued and ordered to pay extensive financial damages to Seraw's family. Mic Crenshaw and some other Minneapolis ARA members relocated to Portland and founded the Portland ARA chapter there in response.

Public attention given to this case caused a growth in networks affiliated with ARA. New sections sprung up around the issue, including in Los Angeles, where it was also known as People Against Racist Terror. Some members of Anti-Racist Action in Minneapolis had been affiliated with an anarchist group called the Revolutionary Anarchist Bowling League.

Marty Williams of Chicago ARA stated that, by 1992, the network had expanded beyond its original subcultural base in the skinhead scene to include students, workers, anarchist punks and older left-wing activists. Anti-Racist Action built up connections to black power groups in places like Chicago, and integrated aspects of third-wave feminism and, as part of this, defended abortion clinics against fundamentalist attacks. According to Bray, ARA was "predominantly anarchist and antiauthoritarian, as reflected in the influential role of the Love and Rage Revolutionary Anarchist Federation, an unorthodox anarchist group with Trotskyist and New Left influences (some of whose members had previously been in the Revolutionary Anarchist Bowling League), with whom they worked closely.

Starting on October 15, 1994, Anti-Racist Action chapters in the Midwest began to organize an annual conference under the banner of the Midwest Anti-Fascist Network. The first took place in Columbus, Ohio. These annual conferences had guest speakers at each event. The first featured Signe Waller, the widow of Michael Waller, a Communist Workers' Party member killed during the Greensboro massacre in 1979. In 1995, Chip Berlet was the guest speaker, along with Rita "Bo" Brown of the George Jackson Brigade as well as Waller. (Note: Jeffrey Kaplan, an academic at the University of Wisconsin–Oshkosh stated in his book, The Cultic Milieu: Oppositional Subcultures in an Age of Globalization (2002): "On 25 September 1995, the second annual "Midwest Anti-Fascist Network" held a three-day conference in Columbus, Ohio. Speakers included Chip Berlet along with the following: Rita Bo Brown, former member of the nominally terrorist George Jackson Brigade (GJB). Jackson was killed in August 1970 when his brother attempted to free him from Soledad Prison by bursting in to a Marin County, CA, courtroom handing guns to three convicts and taking five hostages. In the shootout that ensued five people were killed including the judge. Signe Waller, former member of Jerry Tung's Worker's Viewpoint Organization (WPO), which evolved into the Communist Workers Party (CWP), a small, violence-prone Marxist-Leninist section. In 1979, armed members of the CWP were killed in a shootout with Ku Klux Klansmen in Greensboro, NC. Her husband, Michael Waller, was one of five people killed. Also in attendance were representatives of Southern Poverty Law Center's Klanswatch project, Lenny Zeskind's Center for Democratic Renewal and RASH, an anti-racist skinhead organization.")

The network expanded into Canada, particularly Toronto. In 1992, the Heritage Front, at the time the largest neo-Nazi group in Canada, marched on Toronto's courthouse; organising against this catalysed the formation of a local ARA chapter. The police force's employment of pepper spray against the ARA protesters was the first use of this weapon as a means to control a political demonstration in Canadian history. The Heritage Front supported the German-born Holocaust denier and apologist for the Third Reich, Ernst Zündel, who was the subject of a significant political controversy with the Canadian Human Rights Commission and the organized Canadian Jewish community. According to a 1997 article in The Ottawa Times, Anti-Racist Action's Toronto branch built up a close working relationship with B'nai B'rith Canada, a major Jewish advocacy group.

In 1996, B'nai B'rith Canada attempted to secure state funding for Anti-Racist Action through Sam Title, who stated at the time that B'nai B'rith had "worked with them before." Karen Mock, the National Director of B'nai B'rith was pictured at an ARA conference in 1997. After Mock attended the meeting the relationship was subject to the feature in The Ottawa News in 1997, which courted controversy for B'nai B'rith due to ARA's links to violence and "extremism". One of the more notable events involving ARA in Toronto was the trashing of the home of a Heritage Front member on 11 June 1993. According to The Ottawa Times, "as reported by the Canadian Intelligence Service, the ARA has also been linked by the Canadian Security Intelligence Service (CSIS) with the 1995 arson attack on Ernst Zündel's home". Zündel, of German-birth, was in any case deported from Toronto, Canada that year.

In October 1997, ARA Minneapolis and ARA Toronto attended a conference in London, which brought together twenty-two delegates from the emerging international, mostly European, militant anti-fascist movements. There was a significant disagreement between two of the major groups: the Autonome Antifa (M), a German Antifa delegation based in Göttingen, and Anti-Fascist Action from Britain, who had partly inspired the creation of ARA in the first place. The British-delegation were mostly working-class and argued for a class basis for anti-fascist struggle as well as for physical force against those it defined as fascists. The German AA (M), who were more based in the middle-class intelligentsia, argued that the movement should be based primarily on a "feminist and anti-imperialist" analysis and downgrade "squadism". At the end of the conference, nine groups followed Anti-Fascist Action into the Militant Anti-Fascist Network, including the North American Anti-Racist Action branches, and the German groups Antifaschistische Aktion Hannover and Aktivisten-Gruppe ROTKÄPPCHEN, and a group from Zaragoza. In 1999, the international collapsed, as Anti-Fascist Action in Britain became essentially defunct.

As part of their wider anti-police sentiment activity, including involvement with Cop Watch, members of ARA were involved in supporting Mumia Abu-Jamal (born Wesley Cook), who was convicted for the 1981 murder of PPD officer Daniel Faulkner. In September 1999 in Baltimore, ARA activists organized a seven-car caravan with a loudspeaker in each, voicing slogans in favour of Mumia Abu-Jamal and handing out leaflets to the general public.

=== Early 2000s: dawning of the internet era ===
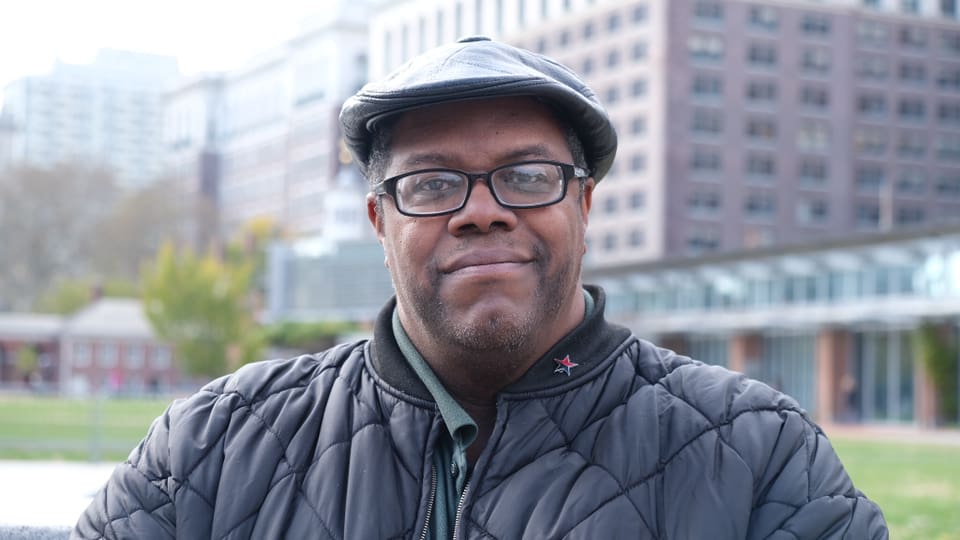
Daryle Lamont Jenkins, ARA gained an early internet foothold with his "doxxing" website One People's Project.

Two members of ARA from Las Vegas, Daniel Shersty and Lin Newborn, were killed by fascists in 1998. During the 1990s, Anti-Racist Action was engaged in conflict with white supremacist revival groups, as captured in the 2000 documentary film Invisible Revolution: A Youth Subculture of Hate.

With the rise of the internet, the new millennium saw a switch to a more information-based "warfare" between ARA and their enemies active within the far-right groups. The white nationalist far-right most circulated around Stormfront, while one of the more prominent website projects associated with ARA at the time was the One People's Project, which maintained contacts with the Southern Poverty Law Center, working together on projects such as Erasing Hate.

Founded in 2000 by Daryle Lamont Jenkins and Joshua David Belser (under the pseudonym "Josh Hoyt"), the One People's Project was a pioneer in the "doxxing" of alleged far-right group activists; as part of their campaign against these individuals, they posted personal information of them on the website, including their full names, dates and place of birth, home address, their place of work, the names of their close family members/partners and any other contact information such as phone numbers. This was subsequently spread among other websites, forums and blogs associated with whichever ARA branch was local to the alleged far-rightist profiled.

Anti-Racist Action's Columbus, Ohio branch, including Jerry or Gerry Bello (also a prominent figure within ARA's Cop Watch), were among several groups (including the Black Bloc, a coalition of anarchist organizations, including the Boston-based Barricada Collective) who were involved in a street fight with far-right activists which led to the arrest of 25 people in York County, Pennsylvania on January 12, 2002. The groups were protesting a speech by Matthew F. Hale's World Church of the Creator at a local library; several other white nationalist groups were also in the area, such as the National Alliance and the Aryan Nations.

According to The Washington Post, on May 11, 2002, around 250 members of the National Alliance, a leading neo-Nazi group, arranged a protest at the Embassy of Israel in Washington, D.C. under Billy Roper, distributing anti-Israel flyers with pictures of the 9/11 attacks and Osama bin Laden with the words "Let's Stop Being Human Shields for Israel" and demanding to cut off US aid to Israel. Their protest was attacked by around 150 opponents including ARA members, as well as some members of the Northeastern Federation of Anarcho-Communists and Labor/Community Committee in Solidarity with the People of Palestine.

On August 24, 2002, the National Alliance returned to Washington D.C. for their "Rock Against Israel" protest; this time however, their opponents, under the banner of the East Coast Anti-Fascist Network (including ARA branches from Baltimore, Philadelphia, New Jersey, Toronto, Columbus and Auora) were better organized in attacking their opponents. However, 28 ARA members were arrested and then when they returned to Baltimore, were subsequently called up on charges of rioting, aggravated assault, possession of a deadly weapon and others. They became known as the "Baltimore Anti-Racist 28" and were eventually released without charge.

With the decline of the Creativity movement (due to the arrest of Hale) and the National Alliance (since the death of William Luther Pierce), other groups on the white nationalist scene attempted to fill the vacuum that this had left, this included the National Socialist Movement (NSM), who organized a rally to "protest black crime" on October 15, 2005, in Toledo, Ohio. Here they were met by members of Anti-Racist Action and the International Socialist Organization, upon which the 2005 Toledo riot ensued.

=== Late 2000s and rebranding as Antifa ===
The first group in the United States to use the term "Antifa" in its title was the Anti-Racist Action Portland branch, known as Rose City Antifa, which was refounded in 2007, according to Alexander Reid Ross, author of Against the Fascist Creep, from Portland State University. This was inspired by the German anarcho-communist autonomists, who engaged in black bloc tactics that year in a mass protest at the 33rd G8 summit (many of the autonomists are associated with Germany's Antifa). Portland Anti-Racist Action blamed neo-Nazis for the 2010 shooting of Luke Querner.

While Barack Obama was President of the United States, groups on the hard far-right began to grow and consequently, groups emerged to engage in violence with them. Some of these were officially outside the Anti-Racist Action network, such as NYC Antifa, founded in 2010, but others, such as Indiana's Hoosier Anti-Racist Movement (HARM), were officially chapters of ARA.

On May 19, 2012, HARM were involved in a significant incident in Tinley Park, Cook County, Illinois, when a group of 18 HARM members and others physically attacked members of the Illinois European Heritage Association, which was associated with white supremacists, in a restaurant. Five people involved were arrested and charged for their part in the attack with felony mob action, aggravated battery and criminal property damage charges, and were sentenced to between 3½ and 6 years. All were released by the end of 2014.

=== 2013 onwards: Torch Network-era ===
The Torch Network continued the legacy of the ARA Network. In a post on the ARA website in 2013, the Torch Network announced its formation. They stated that this was not a disbanding or a schism, but an attempt to deal with the new realities of the digital age and changing tactics.

The Torch Network held the 1st Annual Torch Network Conference in 2014 at Chitown Futbol, Chicago. This was attended by South Side Chicago Anti-Racist Action (the hosts), Philly Antifa, Central Texas Anti-Racist Action, Milwaukee Antifa, Hoosier Anti-Racist Movement (HARM) and Los Angeles People Against Racist Terror. The event was sponsored by the Chicago May First Anarchist Alliance and Black Rose/Rosa Negra Anarchist Federation. There were two speakers at the event: Matthew Nemiroff Lyons and Michael Staudenmaier.

== See also ==
- Cop Watch
- Emily the Strange
- Red and Anarchist Skinheads
- Skinheads Against Racial Prejudice
- Sojourner Truth Organization
