= Redskin (subculture) =

Communist or anarchist skinhead subculture

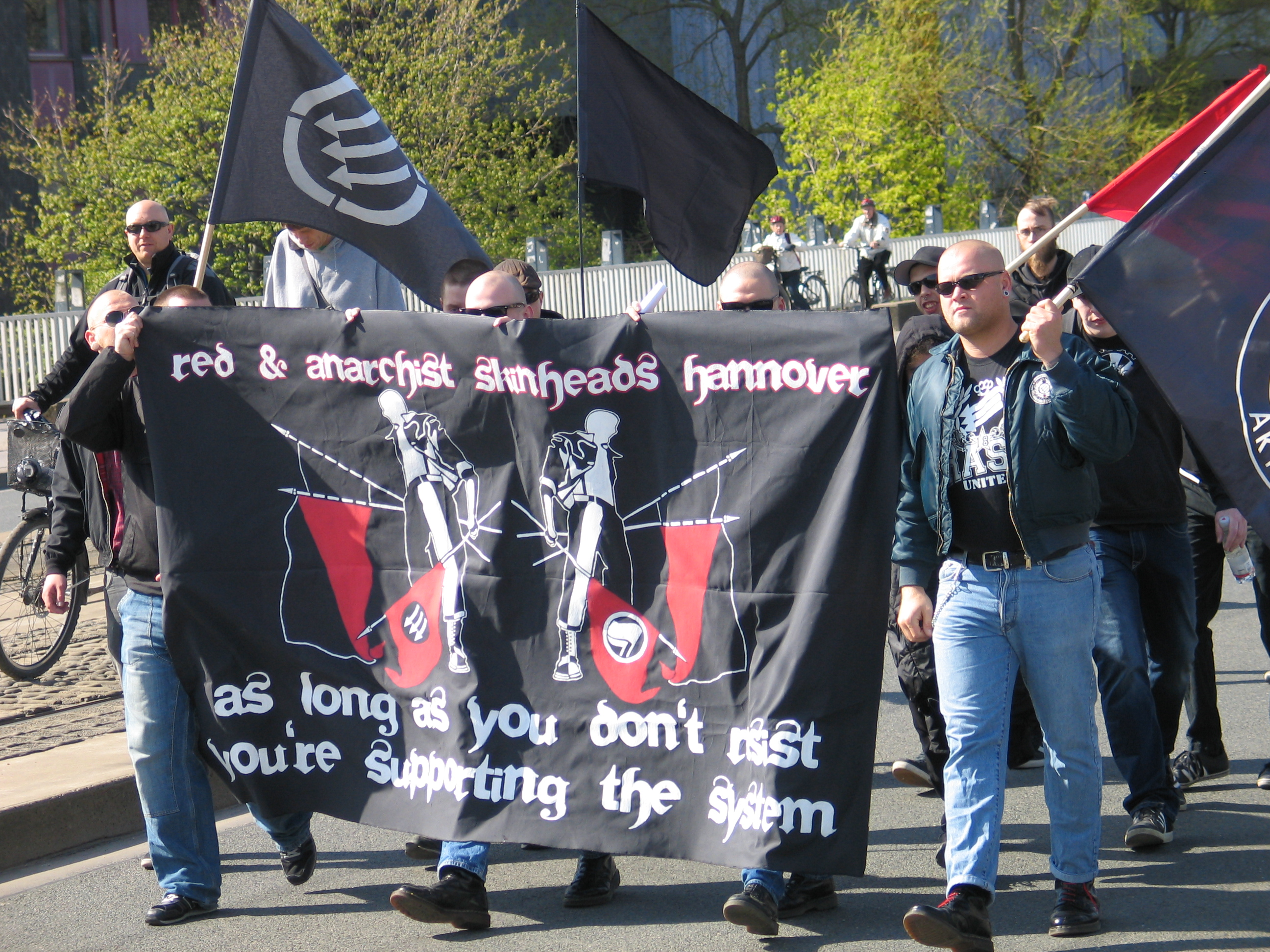
Anarchist, anti-fascist and anti-racist skinheads in Hannover, Germany, 2013

In the context of the skinhead subculture, a redskin is an anarchist or Marxist skinhead. The term combines the word red, (a slang term for anarchist, socialist or communist) with the word skin, which is short for skinhead. Redskins take a militant anti-fascist and pro-working class stance.

The most well-known organization associated with redskins is Red and Anarchist Skinheads (RASH). Other groups that have had redskin members include Anti-Fascist Action, Red Action and Skinheads Against Racial Prejudice, although SHARP does not have an official ideology.

== History ==
In the late 1970s and '80s, the skinhead subculture underwent a revival in Western Europe. The origins of the skinhead subculture were largely apolitical, with working-class youths in 1960s London who were influenced by similar working-class subcultures, like the mods and the Jamaican rude boys. In later decades, a new generation of skinheads came out of the punk subculture, emerging with a distinct style of music and dress.

At this time, the skinhead subculture was made up overwhelmingly of working-class white men, and with the emergence of far-right political parties, such as the French Front National and the British National Front, around the same time, many skinheads adopted far-right and white supremacist views. In the coming decades, these white power skinheads became widely known for racial hate crimes, to the point where popular media began to associate the entire skinhead subculture with racial violence.

In response to this, skinheads who held radical left-wing views, as well as skinheads who were members of minority groups who were being targeted by white supremacists, began forming organized opposition to white power skinheads and the bands and political parties they supported. One such group was the Red Warriors, a youth gang of far-left skinheads who would physically confront white power skinheads in the streets, which often ended in violence.

The Red Warriors often acted as security for punk shows and left-wing activist groups, such as SCALP and SOS Racisme, who were often targeted with violence by white power skinheads. Over time, the Red Warriors and other youth gangs with similar goals became well known in France for their confrontational and violent methods for resisting fascists. These "skinhead hunters" would later influence similar groups of far-left skinheads and anti-fascist groups, in France and around the world.

== Bands ==
Bands associated with redskins include: The Redskins, Angelic Upstarts, Blaggers I.T.A., Kortatu, Skalariak, Banda Bassotti, The Burial, Negu Gorriak, Opció K-95, Los Fastidios, Kaos Urbano, Brigada Flores Magón, Núcleo Terco, Permanent Revolution, and The Press. One record label associated with the subculture is Insurgence Records.
