= Bryon Widner =

American former skinhead

Bryon Widner (born 1977) is an American former white power skinhead.

== Involvement with skinhead movement ==
Widner became a skinhead at the age of 14, and he spent 16 years involved with white supremacist organizations in the midwestern United States, including the Indiana-based Outlaw Hammerskins. Described as a "pit bull", Widner co-founded the Vinlanders Social Club, a white power group in Indiana that soon gained a reputation for excessive violence. This organization became one of the fastest-growing racist skinhead organizations in the US.

== Tattoo removal ==
Widner's efforts to rejoin wider society were significantly hampered by his extensive facial tattoos, many of which had violent or racist imagery. His wife feared that Widner would take drastic action to remove the tattoos, such as immersing his face in acid. She eventually contacted anti-racist activist Daryle Lamont Jenkins of One People's Project who put him in contact with the Southern Poverty Law Center (SPLC).

After "several weeks of conversation," SPLC representatives agreed to help Widner in his quest to remove his facial tattoos. They found a plastic surgeon who was willing to perform the procedure, and an anonymous donor provided $35,000 for the procedures.

== In popular culture ==
Widner's widely-publicized tattoo removal was the subject of Bill Brummel's 2011 documentary Erasing Hate.

The 2018 feature film Skin is loosely based on Widner's life and journey out of the skinhead movement.

== Abuse allegations ==
In 2016, Widner's ex-wife, Julie Miller, fled to Canada and applied for refugee status, saying that Widner had been stalking her after they separated and he was placed under a no-contact order for her and her children in 2014. Widner had previously been arrested for assaulting Miller. After their separation, Miller moved multiple times in response to Widner's continued contact. Courts in Canada granted Miller and her children asylum, an unusual outcome for an American citizen. In 2024, Canadian courts removed Miller's refugee status, ruling that she was ineligible for asylum due to an outstanding arrest warrant in Arizona for the kidnapping of the couple's son, who she had brought to Canada.

== See also ==
- Skin (2018 feature film) – 2018 film by Guy Nattiv, loosely based on Widner's journey out of the neo-Nazi movement
- Erasing Hate – 2011 television film by Bill Brummel
- Christian Picciolini, another former white power skinhead who left the neo-Nazi movement
