= Chicago Area SkinHeads =

American Racist Group

The Chicago Area Skinheads (CASH) was a neo-Nazi white power skinhead group in the United States, founded in 1985. It was also known under the name of Romantic Violence (which was also the name of the rock band of founder Clark Martell), and distributed records and tapes in the US from European white power skinhead bands such as Skrewdriver.

== History ==
CASH was founded in 1985 by Clark Martell as the leader, and six other skinheads under him. They were one of the first racist skinhead gangs formed in the United States. By 1986, CASH grew in size. Martell, and 15 to 20 followers went on an 18-month long crime spree. This included assaults on six Hispanic women, swastikas painted on three synagogues, numerous incidents of vandalism to Jewish-owned businesses, and frequent clashes with the "traditional", non-racist skinheads of the African American founded Chicago punk scene.

The spree ended with the arrest of Martell and six other CASH members for home invasion, aggravated battery and robbery. They broke into a former gang member, a 20 year old woman's apartment, pistol-whipping her, kicking her. spraying her with mace and painting a swastika on her wall with her blood. They suspected her of having black friends after she left CASH. By this time, the number of neo-Nazi skinheads in the area have risen to about 3,000 from just several hundred according to Barry Morrison, regional director of the Anti-Defamation League, but the jailing of Martell "substantially decreased" their strength locally.

After Martell's sentencing, then 16 year old Christian Picciolini became the leader of the group. He merged the group with the violent Hammerskins. While he grew he movement for years, after his first marriage when he was 19, and the birth of two children a couple years later, he opened a record store to support his family. His wife was not a believer in his racist ideology, and pushed for him to leave the movement. This, alongside his experience with the customers of his record store - which included black, Jewish and gay people - led to him slowly and quietly withdrawing from the movement, and officially left it in 1996.

The history of the movement after Picciolini left is unclear, but scholars seem to agree that after Martell was imprisoned, the gang was on the decline, and ultimately, it disbanded, with members either quitting the ideology, or dispersing into other movements, like the Hammerskins.

== Legacy ==
- Hammerskins are still the most violent and well-organized neo-Nazi group in the United States.
