= Red Warriors (gang) =

French anti-fascist redskin gang

- The group's emblem, a sickle crossed with a baseball bat
- Formation: 1985 or 1986
- Founder: Julien Terzics and others
- Founded at: L'Usine, Montreuil, France
- Dissolved: Early 1990s
- Type: Anti-fascist redskin gang
- Location(s): Paris and its eastern suburbs
- Members: About 15
- Leader: Julien Terzics
- Affiliations: SCALP

The Red Warriors were a redskin anti-fascist gang from the Paris region, formed in 1985 or 1986 and disbanded in the early 1990s. The group was formed around Julien Terzics at L'Usine, a squat in Montreuil, and brought together around 15 young martial artists who physically confronted far-right skinheads in the streets of Paris. Like the Ducky Boys and the Black Dragons, it was one of the so-called "skinhead hunters" (chasseurs de skins), gangs that physically confronted far-right skinheads in the streets of Paris in the late 1980s. Most of its members were anarchists or apolitical, but they displayed Soviet symbols to provoke their opponents. The gang was close to the Sections carrément anti-Le Pen (SCALP) and provided security for concerts by Bérurier Noir and for demonstrations organised by SOS Racisme.

== History ==
The Red Warriors were founded in 1985 or 1986 at L'Usine, a squat in Montreuil. One of the co-founders, Julien Terzics, explained that the gang grew out of the frustration of punks who were forced to avoid entire neighbourhoods of Paris where skinheads attacked them, such as the Latin Quarter, Tolbiac and Les Halles. The idea was to bring together young people willing to physically confront the far right. According to Terzics, the gang's name was a reference to communism, which the far right then regarded as its main enemy.

The Red Warriors were based in the working-class housing estates of Paris's eastern suburbs. The group consisted of around 15 young people, several of them immigrants, trained in street fighting. All of them practised martial arts, and historian Mark Bray states that they were all champions in the field. Together with other gangs such as the Ducky Boys, the Redboys and the Lenin Killers, they took part in the emergence of the redskin scene in France. This scene was part of a wider group of skinhead hunters that also included "zulu" gangs close to hip-hop culture, such as the Black Dragons. Julien Terzics led the Red Warriors. He was a former punk and a French full-contact champion. He was also a member of the French Communist Party (PCF) and of the Young Communists in Fontenay-sous-Bois. In the late 1980s, these organisations asked him to leave because of the media attention given to his involvement with the Red Warriors.

Journalist Sébastien Bourdon highlights the importance of combat sports within the group, which carried out repeated raids to drive far-right skinheads out of certain neighbourhoods or events. Members patrolled in search of skinheads to beat up. According to Terzics and another member, Rico, they moved in groups of three or four and scouted skinhead gangs and their meeting places in advance. They often armed themselves with fighting rings, weighted gloves and belts made from bicycle chains. Members took the far-right insignia of the skinheads they defeated as trophies.

The Red Warriors regularly took part in student and anti-racist demonstrations in Paris during the second half of the 1980s. In 1986, during the student protests against the Devaquet bill, Terzics led the security team. The Red Warriors marched wearing helmets and carrying iron bars. From 1987 to 1989, they provided security for punk and alternative rock bands, most notably Bérurier Noir, whose concerts were regularly attacked by neo-Nazi skinheads. They also provided security at events organised by the Sections carrément anti-Le Pen. In 1988, the Red Warriors grew closer to SOS Racisme, which called on them to provide security for its demonstrations. According to Terzics and Rico, the association also asked them to put up its posters at night during the presidential election campaign, in the face of armed National Front poster teams. They agreed in exchange for payment, two vans and fuel costs, resources they also used to hunt neo-Nazi skinheads in Paris.

In the very early 1990s, the gang petered out. Some members grew tired of the violence, while others had children or left France. Former members also attribute this end to the near disappearance of neo-Nazi skinheads from the streets of Paris, which they credit to the actions of the skinhead hunters and zulu gangs. Left without opponents, the Red Warriors disbanded informally without seeking new enemies, unlike some zulu gangs that ended up fighting each other. Writing in Libération, Jean-Christophe Féraud and Noa Jacquet date Terzics's withdrawal to after Bérurier Noir's farewell concert at the Olympia in 1989.

== Political stance ==
According to Terzics, the group was initially concerned only with self-defence and street fighting. Older activists later made its members aware of the political and anti-fascist dimension of their clashes, which they then embraced. In 1988, Terzics defined the gang's goal as "to reduce to nothing, physically and intellectually, everything that smacks of the far right". (Note: French original: réduire à néant, physiquement et intellectuellement, tout ce qui respire l'extrême droite.) He presented the group's violence as a response to repeated attacks by far-right skinheads.

Terzics was then a communist, while most of the other members described themselves as apolitical or close to anarchist or autonomist circles hostile to the PCF. In 1988, Renaud Leblond reported in L'Express that some members held PCF membership cards, while Mark Bray describes the members as mostly anarchists or situationists. The gang's Soviet imagery mainly served to provoke far-right skinheads, who professed their hatred of communism. Terzics stated that the gang did not include a single genuine Marxist–Leninist.

According to Marc-Aurèle Vecchione's documentary Antifa, chasseurs de skins, the Red Warriors were the only skinhead hunters to engage in political activism. They grew close to the SCALP, anti-fascist and libertarian groups founded in Toulouse in 1984, with whom they wrote leaflets and organised rock concerts. In 1988, they shot a music video with Bérurier Noir denouncing the Killing Fields of Democratic Kampuchea; Leblond saw this as a way for them to assert their independence from the communists.

Unlike the other members, Terzics sought to publicise the gang's struggle. He appeared in several television reports and in 1988 described the Red Warriors' commitment as a radical and violent anti-fascism without political supervision. He refused any dialogue with the far right and justified physical confrontation as a way of not ceding public space to it.

== Visual identity ==
Like their opponents, the members identified as skinheads. Their clothing style combined skinhead, punk and hip-hop influences. It was suited to fighting, with shaved heads to deny opponents a grip and fighting rings. Saïd Mahrane writes in Le Point that only their haircut, less closely shaved on top, and the patches on their sleeves set them apart from far-right skinheads. They wore their flight jackets inside out, with the orange lining showing, to distinguish themselves from neo-Nazi skinheads during fights. They also displayed red stars and a symbol combining a sickle and a baseball bat, and more rarely the hammer and sickle.

== Legacy ==
Vecchione's documentary presents the Red Warriors as the "godfathers" of the French redskin movement, whose actions inspired others throughout France. The documentary introduced the Red Warriors to a younger and wider audience. According to Bourdon, the gang remains little known to the general public but famous within anti-fascist circles. He considers that the documentary, which has become something of a cult film among anti-fascist activists, largely contributed to building the myth of the skinhead hunters. Terzics later became a father figure of the Parisian anti-fascist scene. The bar he ran in Ménilmontant, Le Saint-Sauveur, served as a meeting place for much of that scene. He died on 1 July 2024 in Nantes, at the age of 55.
