= Anti-Fascist Action =

British anti-fascist organisation

- Formation: 1985
- Dissolved: 2001
- Type: Militant anti-fascism
- Location: London, England, UK
- Affiliations: Red Action and Direct Action Movement

Anti-Fascist Action (AFA) was a militant anti-fascist organisation, founded in the UK in 1985 by a wide range of anti-racist and anti-fascist organisations.

It was active in fighting far-right organisations, particularly the National Front and British National Party. It was notable in significantly reducing fascist street activity in Britain in the 1990s. AFA had what they called a "twin-track" strategy: physical confrontation of fascists on the streets and ideological struggle against fascism in working class communities.

Among its more notable mobilisations were violent confrontations such as the "Battle of Waterloo" at London Waterloo station in 1992 and non-violent events such as the Unity Carnivals of the early 1990s.

== History ==
AFA was partly a reaction to the perceived inadequacies of the original Anti-Nazi League (ANL), which had recently wound up its operations. AFA members accused ANL of failing to directly confront fascists, of allying with moderates who were complicit in racism, and of being a front for the vanguardist Socialist Workers Party (SWP). Jeremy Corbyn was either national secretary or honorary president of this first incarnation of AFA in 1985.

According to historian Nigel Copsey, "this original AFA unravelled due to internal tensions between militant anti-fascists and more moderate anti-racists... By 1988, fractured by in-house sectarianism, AFA had all but collapsed." In 1989, though, it "was resurrected as a militant, physical force anti-fascist group."

Although many Trotskyist groups, independent socialists, anarchists and members of the Labour Party were active in AFA in the 1980s, after its relaunch in 1989 the main members were from various anarchist groups and Red Action, a group founded by disillusioned militant anti-fascist ex-SWP members who had criticised perceived populist or popular front politics of the ANL.

In 1986 and 1987, thousands of people took part in AFA mobilisations such as the Remembrance Day demonstrations. In 1988, AFA formed a musical arm, Cable Street Beat, named after the Battle of Cable Street, a 1936 confrontation between fascists and anti-fascists, on similar principles to the Anti-Nazi League's Rock Against Racism.

In May 1989, there was an AFA mobilisation against a Blood and Honour gig, "the Main Event".

In early 1989, Cable Street Beat launched a magazine, Cable Street Beat Review. Among the artists who performed for early Cable Street Beat events were Blaggers ITA, Angelic Upstarts, Attila the Stockbroker, The Men They Couldn't Hang, Forgotten Sons, and Blyth Power.

In 1989, there was a split in AFA between militant anti-fascists and other members, such as the Newham Monitoring Group, whose views were closer to liberal anti-fascism. The militant groups relaunched AFA that year, with the affiliates Direct Action Movement and Workers' Power, as well as several trade unions.

=== Early 1990s ===
In the early 1990s, AFA continued the pattern of twin-track physical and ideological confrontations with fascism. Examples of the former include the first Unity Carnival in east London in 1991, with 10,000 participants, and a demonstration in Bethnal Green, with 4,000 participants, under the slogan “Beating the Fascists: An old East End tradition”.

Cable Street Beat continued in the early 1990s, with the involvement of bands including the reformed The Selecter, Bad Manners and Gary Clail.

Physical resistance to fascism also continued. In 1990, three AFA members were jailed for a total of 11 years following an attack on a neo-Nazi activist. In May 1992, AFA's militant approach to anti-fascism was given media airing, when the BBC screened a documentary, Fighting Talk, as part of its Open Space series.

On 11 September 1992, a long street battle between AFA against Blood and Honour supporters, skinheads, hooligan firms and far-right groups, was dubbed the Battle of Waterloo, as it was centred on Waterloo station. There were stabbings, and 36 people were arrested.

By this time, there were 21 branches of AFA listed in Fighting Talk, in locations including Birmingham, Brighton, Glasgow, Edinburgh, Bristol, Cardiff, Oxford, Exeter, Leicester, Liverpool, Manchester and Norwich.

=== "Filling the Vacuum" strategy ===
In 1993, Derek Beackon, a candidate from the British National Party (BNP), won a council seat in Millwall on the Isle of Dogs in Tower Hamlets, under the slogan of "Rights for Whites". This signalled a turn in the BNP's policy from confrontation on the streets to a bid for electoral respectability, partly as a response to their defeat on the streets by AFA. In 1994, BNP activist Tony Lecomber announced this change in tactics, with a statement to the press that there would be "no more meetings, marches, punch-ups".

In 1995, London AFA responded with its Filling the Vacuum strategy, which involved offering a political alternative in these communities, instead of concentrating on challenging the fascist presence on the streets. After 1995, Red Action and its allies campaigned within the AFA Network, for AFA as an organisation, adopting the "Filling the Vacuum" strategy. Given that AFA contained a number of political groups, with differing political programmes, this, and the decline of street action by the BNP as it embraced "respectable electoralism", contributed to the breakup of much of the AFA network, with much internal recrimination.

After 1995, anti-fascist mobilisations still occurred, such as ones against the National Front in Dover in 1997 and 1998. The number of AFA branches across the UK peaked at 38 in the mid-1990s, with regular national conferences and an active Northern Network. A new AFA National Coordinating Committee was set up. In 1997, an official AFA statement forbade members from associating with Searchlight. In 1998, the committee expelled Leeds and Huddersfield AFA for ignoring this policy. There were some local relaunches of AFA groups, such as in Liverpool in 2000, but by 2001, AFA barely existed as a national organisation.

In 2011, some re-formed in the Anti-Fascist Network to recreate the "two-track" approach of AFA.

== Politics ==
Critics argue that AFA's physical confrontation approach was often more visible than their ideological work, and their tactics were criticised for their squadism and use of violence. However, supporters of AFA's approach cite its involvement in the youth music scene and successful propaganda events like the 1986 and 1987 Remembrance Day "Remember the victims of Fascism" marches as evidence of this wider agenda.

== See also ==
- Anti-Nazi League
- Red Action
- Skinheads Against Racial Prejudice
- Searchlight (magazine)
- Redskin (subculture)

International:

- Antifaschistische Aktion, Germany
- Anti-Racist Action, US

General:

- Squadism
- United front
- Post-World War II anti-fascism
