= Anti-Nazi League =

UK-based anti-fascist group set up by the Socialist Workers Party

- Anti-Nazi League logo
- Abbreviation: ANL
- Successor: Unite Against Fascism (2003)
- Formation: November 1977 (First iteration); 1992 (Second iteration)
- Dissolved: 1981 (First iteration); 2003 (Second iteration)
- Type: Anti-fascism and anti-racism organisation
- Headquarters: United Kingdom
- Affiliations: Socialist Workers Party

The Anti-Nazi League (ANL) was an organisation that existed from 1977 to 1981, and then again from 1992 to 2003. The organisation was originally established by the Socialist Workers Party (SWP) with sponsorship from some trade unions and the endorsement of a list of prominent people to oppose the rise of far-right groups in the United Kingdom. It was wound down in 1981. The group was relaunched in 1992, but merged into Unite Against Fascism in 2003.

== 1977–1982 ==
The ANL was initially set up in November 1977. It was initially led by a triumvirate of SWP member Paul Holborow, Labour Party member Peter Hain, and senior AUEW official Ernie Roberts. The group has been said to have been a front organisation for the SWP by the Politico's guide to the history of British political parties , but John Kelly labels it as a "Trotskyist-initiated broad social movement" and points to its initial leadership as it being a broader organisation.

The group held its first conference in 1978 which was attended by 800 delegates, and by 1979 the group had 40,000-50,000 members across 250 branches.

The ANL's main activities were in opposition to the far-right group, the National Front (NF) which was specifically referred to as a Nazi organisation by the ANL. The ANL also campaigned against the British Movement which was a more openly Hitlerite grouping.

The ANL was linked to Rock Against Racism in the 1970s, which ran two giant carnivals in 1978 involving bands such as The Clash, Stiff Little Fingers, Steel Pulse, Misty in Roots, X-Ray Spex and Tom Robinson, attended by 80,000 and then 100,000 supporters.

Alongside the broad "marches and music festival" focus of the ANL, in 1977 the SWP also formed regional fighting groups, initially in Manchester and then elsewhere, known as "squads" to both safeguard the ANL's broad, populist activities, though aggressive stewarding, and also to fight the National Front street gangs whenever the opportunity arose. Although the SWP leadership eventually turned against this "dual track" approach to anti-fascism – expelling many leading "squadists" in a purge in late 1981 – it is said to have proved an effective strategy during the ANL's early years from 1977 to 1979.

The ANL's activities played a part in the decline of the NF's vote share in the 1977-1979 local elections and none of its candidates gaining over five percent of the vote in the 1979 general election.

=== Relationship with other organisations ===
Many trade unions sponsored it, as did the Indian Workers' Association (then a large organisation), and many members of the Labour Party, including MPs such as Neil Kinnock and future MPs such as trade unionist Ernie Roberts and anti-apartheid campaigner Peter Hain. The group received support from other Trotskyist groups like the International Marxist Group but they were not involved in the organisational leadership.

According to socialist historian Dave Renton, the ANL was "an orthodox united front" based on a "strategy of working class unity", as advocated by Leon Trotsky. Critics of the ANL, such as Anti-Fascist Action argue that the ANL's co-operation with "bourgeois" groups who work closely with the state, such as Searchlight magazine and the Labour Party, rule out this description, making it a classic popular front. The Revolutionary Communist Party also criticised the ANL's stance as being too narrow. John Kelly agrees that the ANL was a popular front, but cites that as one of several reasons behind its success and states that individuals from the SWP and Counterfire were not concerned with these criticisms.

=== Blair Peach killing ===
In April 1979, an ANL member, Blair Peach, was killed following a demonstration at Southall against a National Front election meeting. Police had sealed off the area around Southall Town Hall, and demonstrators trying to make their way there were blocked. In the ensuing confrontation, more than 40 people (including 21 police) were injured, and 300 were arrested. Bricks were allegedly hurled at police, who described the rioting as the most violent they had handled in London. Peach was among the demonstrators. During an incident in a side street 100 yards from the town hall, he was seriously injured and collapsed after being struck on the head, allegedly by an unauthorised weapon used by a member of the police Special Patrol Group. Peach died later in hospital.

An inquest jury later returned a verdict of misadventure, and no police officer was ever charged or prosecuted, although an internal police inquiry at the time and not released officially for 30 years, thought he had been killed by an unidentifiable police officer. A primary school in Southall bears his name.

=== Closing of the ANL ===
In 1981, with the eclipse of the National Front and collapse of the British Movement, the initial incarnation of the ANL was wound up.

Some elements within the ANL opposed the winding up of the organisation, including some members of the SWP. After being expelled from the Socialist Workers Party some of these elements formed Red Action and with others organised Anti-Fascist Action.

The ANL was significant in opposing the National Front during the late 1970s due to its large numbers across branches and at protests. Despite the movement's success they did not help the growth of the affiliated Trotskyist groups. Between 1977–1979, 500 members left the SWP, and 1714 left the Socialist Labour League. Ian Birchall reasoned that the SWP's membership loss was because the ANL was not directly used as a recruitment tool.

== 1992–2004 ==
In the early 1990s, the far right, and in particular the British National Party (BNP) was resurgent both electorally and in terms of racial attacks (from 4,383 in 1988 to 7,780 three years later). Anti-Fascist Action, now the longest established national anti-fascist organisation in the UK at that time, organised well-attended events in October 1991 – a Unity Carnival in East London attracting 10,000 people and a march through Bethnal Green attracting 4,000 people – prompting other left-wing groups to launch anti-racist and anti-fascist organisations, including the Anti-Racist Alliance (ARA) in November and the re-launch of the ANL two months later.

When the National Front and the British National Party had been led by John Tyndall, his record of involvement in openly neo-Nazi groups made it far easier to assert that the National Front and BNP were fascist or neo-Nazi in nature. Similarly, Tyndall's convictions for violence and incitement to racial hatred provide ample grounds for the ANL to claim both organisations were racist. After 1992, the ANL and other anti-fascists argued that the BNP remained a Nazi party irrespective of the fact that under the leadership of Nick Griffin it adopted what the ANL described as the 'Dual Strategy' of cultivating respectability in the media while retaining a cadre of committed fascists. This position was countered by BNP members who said that their party is increasingly democratic in its nature. An investigation by The Guardian newspaper on 22 December 2006 reported that the BNP remained a fascist party.

ANL's relaunch was criticised by other anti-racists. The recently launched broad-based Anti-Racist Alliance said: "The ANL is an exercise in nostalgia. These people are living off the glory of a few years in the late 1970s, when we're setting up a long-term challenge to racism in Europe, an anti-racist organisation that will live in the community and in the mainstream of political life." ARA's chair Ken Livingstone used his column in The Sun to denounce the ANL as an SWP front. Anti-fascist magazine Searchlight criticised the "politics of deceit being practised by the SWP", accusing the ANL of deliberately exaggerating the danger posed by the BNP.

In 1993, the ANL organised a demonstration, attended by up 15,000 people (and marred by police provocation and violence) at the BNP's bookshop in Welling, in the wake of the killing nearby of black teenager Stephen Lawrence, attended by Stephen's mother Doreen Lawrence; ARA held a rival protest in central London on the same day. However, Doreen Lawrence came to realise that the ANL was a "front for the Socialist Workers Party". She later wrote that "the various groups that had taken an interest in Stephen's death were tearing each other apart and were in danger of destroying our campaign which we wanted to keep focused and dignified", and Doreen and Neville Lawrence wrote to both the ANL and ARA to demand that they "stop using Stephen's name".

In 2001, an event it planned in Burnley was banned by the Home Secretary.

ANL worked with Love Music Hate Racism (based on the earlier Rock Against Racism), from 2002 onwards.

In 2004, the ANL affiliated with the National Assembly Against Racism to relaunch as Unite Against Fascism. The ANL National Organiser at the time of the creation of Unite Against Fascism was Weyman Bennett, a member of the Central Committee of the Socialist Workers Party as was Julie Waterson, its previous National Organiser.

== 2018 ==
In August 2018, the Shadow Chancellor John McDonnell called for a revival of "an Anti-Nazi League-type cultural and political campaign" following a number of far-right and racist incidents in the UK, including an attack on a socialist bookshop by members of the far-right, marches in favour of far-right activist Tommy Robinson and high-profile Islamophobia in the Conservative Party. This "welcome and timely" call to action was supported in a Guardian letter signed by the league's founders, which included former Labour minister Peter Hain, political activist Paul Holborow and leading musicians from Rock Against Racism.
