= 2005 Toledo riot =

Clash between neo-Nazi and anti-fascist demonstrators in Ohio

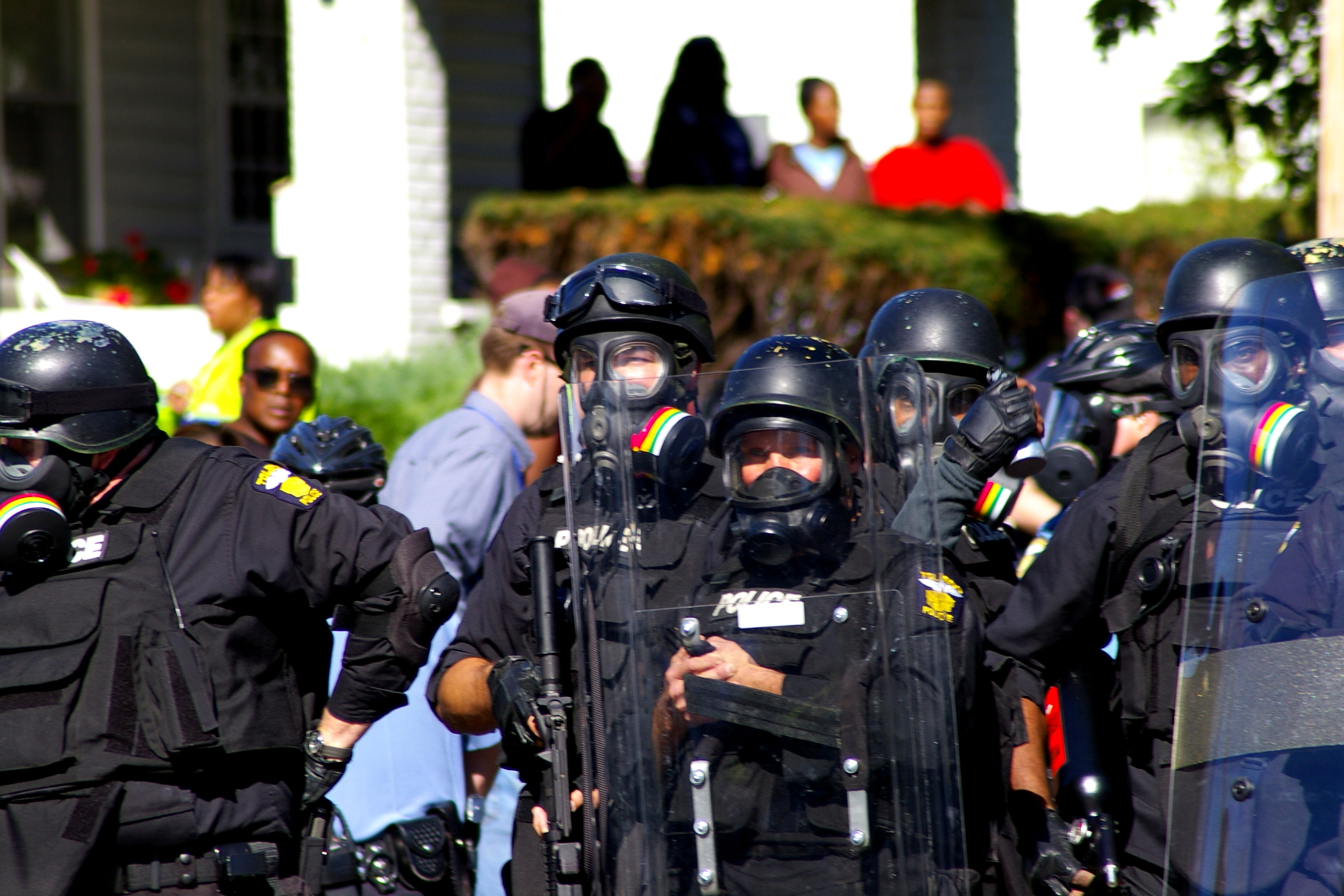
- Riot police in Toledo, OH prepare to move against protesters on 15 October 2005
- Date: October 15, 2005
- Location: Toledo, Ohio
- Caused by: Planned neo-Nazi march
- Methods: Rioting, street fighting, vandalism, looting

Parties
National Socialist Movement	Anti-Racist Action	Toledo police

Casualties
- Injuries: 12
- Arrested: Dozens

The 2005 Toledo riot, on October 15, 2005, occurred when the National Socialist Movement (NSM), a neo-Nazi organization, planned a march to protest African-American gang activity in the North End of Toledo, in the U.S. state of Ohio. The appearance of the group sparked a four-hour riot by elements within the assembled protesters, and caused a citywide curfew to be implemented for the remainder of the weekend.

== Neo-Nazis plan to march through Toledo's North End ==
Several weeks before the rally, members of the National Socialist Movement went door-to-door through a North Toledo neighborhood, and discussed with residents the possibility of addressing gang activity. The NSM claimed that a local resident invited the group, but the named individual refuted this, saying that the group misrepresented themselves and that he did not invite the NSM. The NSM planned to march through the North End of Toledo, Ohio.

The group stated that the purpose of the march was to protest gang activity in the area. Approximately fifteen supporters of the NSM, including Bill White, gathered under police guard in preparation to march. They began an impromptu rally at the staging point for the march, shouting insults and other racial slurs at black members of the community.

== Rally turns to rioting ==
Responses had been organized during the week leading up to the rally. Neighborhood residents, the Toledo chapter of the International Socialist Organization, local anarchist organizations, and Anti-Racist Action groups from other cities coordinated in planning a massive protest aimed at forcing the NSM rally to be cancelled. The protesters directed aggression against the police, who responded by arresting dozens. This set off a four-hour conflict between over 500 protesters and the Toledo police force. Police cancelled the NSM march as the situation between police and the crowd escalated. Members of the NSM and their supporters were told to leave town with a police escort.

While the neo-Nazi group had already left the park, most of the community members and protesters were unaware of this and began rioting. Eleven police personnel suffered injury, and one paramedic suffered a concussion after a brick smashed through the side window of her vehicle, hitting her in the head. Police, media vehicles and emergency vehicles were all targeted. A number of stores in the community were targeted by the crowd, including a local bar, believed by many locals to be a regular hangout for police and politicians, which was broken into and set on fire. A local gas station was also looted. Police arrested several dozen rioters, most of whom were residents of the North End. According to the mayor, a number of protesters were wearing gang colors.

Although disturbed by the NSM's intentions to march, the city's mayor, Jack Ford, was extremely critical of the riot, saying that it was "just what they [the neo-Nazis] wanted." Ford declared that a state of emergency existed, and imposed an 8 pm curfew on the entire city. Police officers from several jurisdictions, local SWAT team members, and private security firms patrolled the North End that evening.

== Neo-Nazis return for rally ==
The NSM were granted permission to rally at the Government Center in downtown Toledo on December 10, 2005. The Ohio State Highway Patrol was responsible for security at the center. The stated purpose of the rally was to protest how the city dealt with the previous planned march. Approximately 45 people participated in the one-hour rally, separated from 170 observers and counter-protesters by approximately 700 law-enforcement personnel. The assembled police forces - which included local, state, and federal officers - had at their disposal additional support as mounted patrols, armored personnel carriers, and rooftop snipers. In addition, a last minute injunction was granted by Judge Thomas Osowik on December 9, barring public gatherings of any kind for the following two weeks.

Aggressive policing of the counter-protesters, which included the reported use of police Tasers, resulted in a total of 29 arrests. Three of those arrested were photojournalists covering the event. People entering the rally zone, including members of the media, were subject to searches, and police engaged in videotaping all persons near the rally site for what was termed as "intelligence gathering for future investigations." The majority of arrests occurred in the police controlled observation area; however, several people were arrested near public libraries for violating a court order banning unauthorized protests. Local attorneys and civil rights activists protested the unusually strict police tactics, summed up by one attorney: "What you have in Toledo is martial law for a day."

None of the neo-Nazis who participated in the rally were arrested, but they were escorted from the rally site in buses protected by police.

In retaliation, a local tattoo parlor that had allegedly been used as a base of operations for the NSM rally was vandalized later that night. The front window was smashed out with a rock marked with the anarchist circle "A" symbol. The owner of the parlor blamed the attack on an anarchist group called "The A Project."

== See also ==
- Anti-Racist Action
- List of riots
- Bill White (neo-Nazi)
- National Socialist Movement (United States)
- List of incidents of civil unrest in the United States
