= Erasing Hate =

2011 television film by Bill Brummel

- Written by: Bill Brummel
- Directed by: Bill Brummel
- Starring: Bryon Widner
- Country of origin: United States

Production
- Producer: Bill Brummel

Original release
- Network: MSNBC
- Release: June 6, 2011

Erasing Hate is a 2011 American TV documentary chronicling the efforts of reformed white power skinhead Bryon Widner to remove his numerous racist facial tattoos. Written, produced, and directed by Bill Brummel, it first aired on June 6, 2011 on MSNBC.

== Synopsis ==
Bryon Widner (born c. 1977) became a skinhead at the age of 14, and he spent 16 years involved with racist organizations in the midwestern United States. Described as a "pit bull", Widner co-founded Vinlanders Social Club, a white power group in Indiana that soon gained a reputation for excessive violence. This organization became one of the fastest-growing racist skinhead organizations in the US.

In 2005, Widner married Julie Larsen, who had three children from a previous marriage. In 2006, the couple had a son. The responsibilities of fatherhood gave Widner the desire to reform and leave the racist movement, a desire shared by Larsen. Widner left his organization and endured years of death threats and harassment while attempting to turn his life around. Widner's efforts to rejoin wider society were significantly hampered by his extensive facial tattoos, many of which were violent or racist. Larsen feared that Widner would take drastic action to remove the tattoos, such as immersing his face in acid. Larsen eventually contacted anti-racist activist Daryle Lamont Jenkins of One People's Project who put her in contact with the Southern Poverty Law Center (SPLC).

After "several weeks of conversation," SPLC representatives agreed to help Widner in his quest to remove his facial tattoos. They found a plastic surgeon who was willing to perform the procedure, and an anonymous donor provided $35,000 for the procedures. The complete removal of Widner's facial tattoos took a little over a year and a half and over a dozen individual procedures, all of which were excruciatingly painful.

== See also ==
- Skin (2018), an American biographical drama film written and directed by Guy Nattiv, which follows the life of former skinhead group member Bryon Widner, and stars Jamie Bell and Danielle Macdonald.
