= Julien Terzics =

French musician and anti-fascist activist (1968–2024)

Julien Terzics (28 November 1968 – 1 July 2024) was a French anti-fascist activist, drummer for the band Brigada Flores Magon, and confederal secretary of the CNT. He co-founded and led the Red Warriors redskin anti-fascist gang until 1989. He died on 1 July 2024, at the age of 55.

== Interviews ==
- Raphael (Fall 2021). "An Interview with Julien Terzics, Ex-Skinhead Hunter" (PDF). Barricade. No. 4. pp. 375–394.
