= One People's Project =

USA far-right monitoring organization

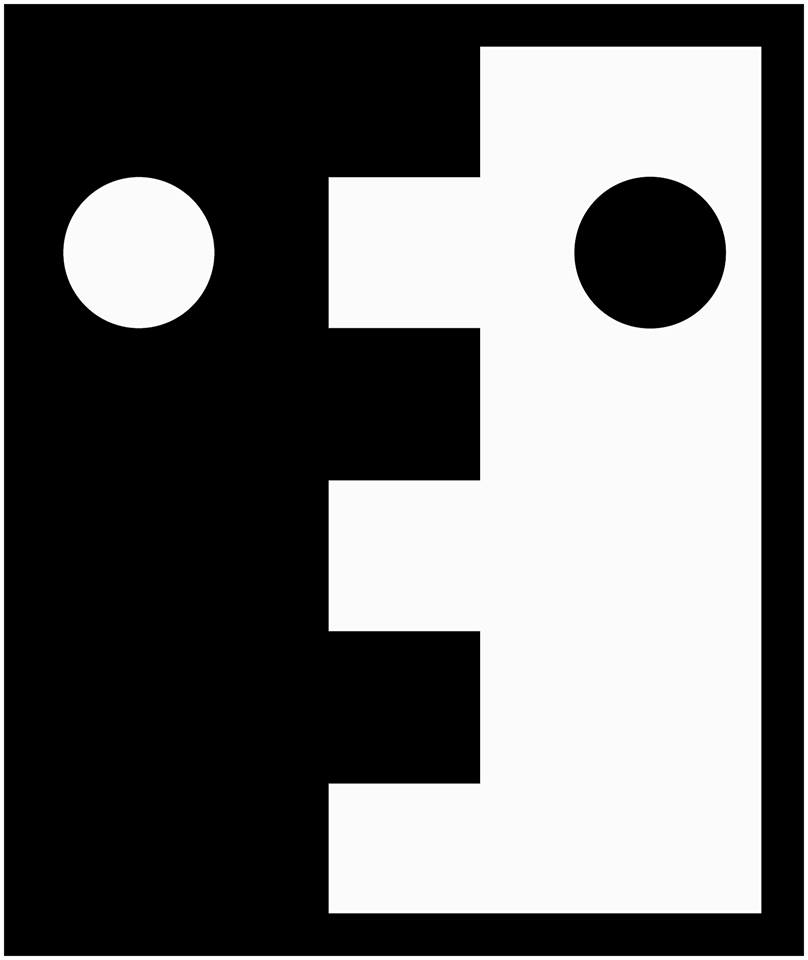
- Abbreviation: OPP
- Formation: 2000
- Type: Non-Profit corporation, 501(c)(3)
- Purpose: Civil liberties advocacy, anti-racism
- Region served: United States & Canada
- Executive Director: Daryle Lamont Jenkins
- Website: onepeoplesproject.com

One Peoples Project (OPP) is an organization founded in 2000 to monitor and publish information about alleged racist and far-right groups and individuals, mostly in the United States. The group has about fifteen volunteers in addition to its most prominent members, Daryle Lamont Jenkins, its founder, and Joshua Hoyt, who joined the group in 2002. It has been called "the most mainstream and well-known anti-fascist or antifa" organization in the United States. Its motto is "Hate Has Consequences".

OPP originated from a July 4, 2000, protest against a Nationalist Movement rally in Morristown, New Jersey that was billed as Independence from Affirmative-Action Day. The counter-demonstration was called the One People's Rally. Three hundred anti-racist protesters turned out to face nine supporters of the Nationalist Movement. At the time, Jenkins was a member of the New Brunswick, New Jersey–based group New Jersey Freedom Organization (NJFO). Originally named One People's Coalition, with Jenkins as its spokesperson, the group researched and published information about the Nationalist Movement's awards ceremony at the Manville Veterans of Foreign Wars hall. This led to the cancellation of the event.

Over the next year, the renamed One People's Project broadened their focus, to publish information on their website about American conservatives, in addition to those on the far right. In November 2001, OPP began focusing heavily on white supremacist groups that were attempting to take advantage of the September 11, 2001 attacks. The most notable of these groups was the Hillsboro, West Virginia–based National Alliance.

OPP has published phone numbers, home addresses and workplace addresses of individuals they have identified as being far right and/or racist. While this practice has invited criticism by those who say that it can incite others to violence, the group has defended this practice as using the same free speech rights that anti-abortion extremists used to intimidate abortion providers.

On July 28, 2007, when a rally was organized to support a plan by the mayor of Morristown, New Jersey, to deputize law enforcement officials to enforce immigration laws via the Immigration and Nationality Act, OPP posted a notice on their website calling the event an "anti-immigrant rally", although the organizer described it as a rally against illegal immigration. After the rally, the OPP website included the following statement: "[w]e don't think anyone is going to lose any sleep over people chanting during the anti-immigrant side's salute to the flag, Nazis getting slapped around a bit or the pain Robb Pearson & Co. feel over being called racist all the time." According to the OPP website, all charges were dropped when one of those supporters was also charged for his role in the fight, and an agreement was reached.

In 2011, writer David Yeagley filed a lawsuit against Jenkins and OPP for participating in actions that allegedly led to the cancellation of an American Renaissance conference in 2010, where he was supposed to speak. According to Yeagley's lawsuit, OPP and others contacted hotels hosting the conference, "threatening, murder, violence and other forms of retribution" should the event take place. The hotels have never confirmed that this happened, and no charges have been laid, but Yeagley, who died in March 2014, was awarded $50,000 in a default judgement that Jenkins has said cannot be enforced until the case is filed in Pennsylvania.

OPP has played a role in reforming several neo-Nazis, most notably Bryon Widner, a former member of the Vinlanders Social Club who left his beliefs behind with the help of Jenkins and, with further help from the Southern Poverty Law Center, was able to get a massive amount of tattoos removed from his face and hands. This was the subject of the MSNBC documentary Erasing Hate, which has been turned into a feature-length motion picture titled Skin starring Jamie Bell as Widner and Mike Colter playing Jenkins. Danielle Macdonald and Vera Farmiga also star. OPP has also been featured on other television programs, such as The Montel Williams Show, A Current Affair, the Rachel Maddow Show and on AM Joy with Joy Reid. They have also appeared in several newspaper articles and have also been mentioned in Gwen Ifill's book, The Breakthrough.

In 2015, One People's Project launched Idavox.com, which serves as the news line of the organization. In 2020, Jenkins prominently featured in a Netflix documentary titled Alt-Right: Age of Rage, in which he scathingly criticized the alt-right for perpetuating ''ethno-racial nationalism'' in the United States.

On January 27, 2023, a concert held at a church in Asbury Park, New Jersey, to benefit One People's Project was attacked by a lone assailant who smoke bombed and attempted to pepper spray attendees while yelling, “White lives matter!” Nicholas G. Mucci was arrested in March 2023 and charged with aggravated arson, two counts of causing or risking widespread injury or damage, two counts of possession of a destructive device, unlawful possession of a weapon, two counts of possession of a weapon for unlawful purposes, two counts of aggravated assault, two counts of making terroristic threats, possession of an assault firearm, possession of a large capacity ammunition magazine and hindering.
