= The Redskins =

British band

- Origin: York, England
- Genres: Punk rock; soul; rockabilly; pop
- Years active: 1982–1986
- Labels: Decca, London, PolyGram
- Past members: Chris Dean; Martin Hewes; Nick King; Paul Hookham; Lloyd Dwyer; Steve Nicol; Kevin Robinson; Trevor Edwards; Ray Carless

The Redskins were a 1980s English band, notable for their far left-wing politics, skinhead image and catchy, danceable songs. Their music combined influences from soul, rockabilly, pop and punk rock.

== History ==
The band formed in York in 1982 (from the demise of punk band No Swastikas), with Chris Dean (vocals/guitar), Martin Hewes (bass/backing vocals) and Nick King (drums). Chris Dean wrote for the NME under the pseudonym "X. Moore". Dean and Hewes were members of the Socialist Workers Party. The band members wore skinhead clothing styles and helped inspire the redskin movement.

The band released their first single, "Lev Bronstein", on the CNT record label in 1982. They released one more single, "Lean on Me", on CNT before signing to London Records. "Lean on Me" was ranked at number 6 among the top ten "Tracks of the Year" for 1983 by the NME.

On 10 June 1984, a group of white power skinheads attacked the band and their audience during a performance at the free GLC-sponsored Jobs for a Change festival at Jubilee Gardens, South Bank. In November 1984, an appearance on Channel 4's The Tube saw accusations of censorship after the band invited a striking miner on stage to deliver a speech during their performance, and his microphone connection was allegedly cut.

King was replaced in 1985 by Paul Hookham, although for the recording of the band's first EMI/Decca single "Bring it Down", Style Council drummer Steve White was brought in to perform. Shortly afterwards, Hookham took over full-time drum duties. Their next single, "Kick Over The Statues", was rush-released on an independent label with an uncredited sleeve after London/Decca rejected its release as a benefit for the anti-apartheid movement. The band released one full album, Neither Washington Nor Moscow, and two final singles before splitting at the end of 1986.

== Members ==
- Chris Dean (vocals, guitar)
- Martin Hewes (bass, vocals)
- Nick King (drums, 1982–1985)
- Paul Hookham (drums, 1985–1986)
- Lloyd Dwyer (sax, 1982–1985)
- Steve Nicol (trumpet, 1982–1985)
- Kevin Robinson (trumpet, 1986)
- Trevor Edwards (trombone, 1986)
- Ray Carless (tenor sax, 1986)

== Discography ==
=== Albums ===
- Neither Washington Nor Moscow, 1986 (Decca FLP1) – highest chart position: No.31 (UK Albums Chart)
- Neither Washington Nor Moscow (CD), 1997 (London Records 828864) [reissue with two bonus tracks]
- Live, 1995 (Dojo)
- Epilogue, 2010 (Insurgence)

=== Singles and EPs ===
- "Lev Bronstein" / "Peasant Army", 1982 (7", CNT productions CNT007)
- "Lean on Me" / "Unionize", 1983 (7", CNT productions CNT016) – highest chart position: No.3 (UK Indie Chart)
- "Lean on Me" (Northern Mix) / Unionize (Break Mix), 1983 (12" CNTX16)
- "Keep on Keepin' On!" / "Reds Strike The Blues", 1984 (7", Decca F1) – highest chart position: No.43 (UK Singles Chart)
- "Keep on Keepin' On!" / "16 Tons" / "Red Strikes the Blues", 1984 (12" Decca FX1)
- "Bring It Down (This Insane Thing)", 1985 (2x7", Decca FDP2) – highest chart position: No.33 (UK Singles Chart)
- "Bring It Down (This Insane Thing)" / "You Want It? They've Got It!", 1985 (12" Decca FX2)
- "Kick Over The Statues" / "Young & Proud (Anthem of Mistake)", 1985 (7" Abstract AD6)
- "The Power Is Yours" / "Ninety Nine and a Half (Won't Do)", 1986 (7" Decca F3) – highest chart position: No.59 (UK Singles Chart)
- "The Power Is Yours" / "Ninety Nine and a Half (Won't Do)" / "Take No Heroes!" [faster than LP version], 1986 (12" Decca FX3)
- "It Can Be Done" / "K.O!K.O!", 1986 (7" Decca F4) – highest chart position: No.76
- "It Can Be Done" / "Let's Make it Work" / "K.O!K.O!" / "A Plateful of Hateful", 1986 (12" Decca FX4)
- "The Power Is Yours" (propaganda EP), 1986 (10", Decca FXT3)
- "It Can Be Done" / "Let's Make It Work" / "K.O!K.O!" / "A Plateful of Hateful", 1986 (10" Decca FXT4, Russian Import)
- "Peel sessions", 1987 (12", Strange Fruit SFPS 030) – highest chart position: No.23 (UK Indie Chart)

=== Studies ===
- "Marxism in Music: Constructing a Communist Contra-Culture with The Redskins, Rock’n’roll and Revolution" was published by Bloomsbury in 2026, written by Gregor Gall
