= Black Dragons (French gang) =

French anti-racist gang (1986–1990s)

- Founded: 1986
- Founder: Yves "le Vent"
- Founding location: Nanterre, France
- Territory: Paris region; La Défense, Châtelet, Gare d'Austerlitz; Later Montreuil and Vitry-sur-Seine
- Membership (est.): c. 50 active members and 100 sympathizers (1990); Over 600, including 300 in the Paris region (1990)
- Leaders: Yves "le Vent" (1986–1988); Jo Dalton (from 1988)
- Activities: Fights with skinheads and rival gangs
- Allies: Fight Boys; Bourreurs Boys; Cobras; Criminal Syndicate
- Rivals: Skinheads; Requins Juniors; Mendy; Black Fist; Crime Killers Crew

The Black Dragons were an anti-racist gang founded in 1986 in Nanterre (Île-de-France) by Yves "le Vent" in response to racist attacks by skinheads in the Paris region. Organized into patrols around a strict martial discipline, the group drew its philosophy from the legacy of the Black Panthers, the thought of the Zulu Nation and Chinese mythology. After driving skinheads out of several Parisian neighborhoods, the gang declined from the 1990s onward as a result of conflicts with several rival gangs and of legal cases.

== History ==
From the mid-1970s, skinhead groups were present in the Paris region and regularly attacked African immigrants. Their presence in various neighborhoods of the capital and its suburbs made some public spaces hostile to those they regarded as foreigners. In response to this violence, several youth gangs such as the Ducky Boys, the Red Warriors and the Asnays became "skin hunters" and carried out systematic tracking of and fighting with these groups.

In the late 1980s, Jérémie Maradas-Nado, later known as Jo Dalton, grew close to the Asnays. Through them, he met Yves "le Vent", a Haitian-born activist affiliated with the Miami Black Panthers, who already led an organization called the Black Dragons in the United States, founded by his stepfather, and with which he fought the Ku Klux Klan. Yves "le Vent" arrived in France in 1983 and worked as a plumber. Those close to him described him as a follower of Confucius and of Vodou rites, committed to fighting delinquency. He served two prison terms, one for injuring a man he accused of assault, the other for hitting police officers who were attacking a friend.

Yves "le Vent" witnessed several racist attacks by skinheads against African immigrants in Paris and consequently founded the French section of the Black Dragons in 1986 in Nanterre. At first, no white members were admitted, before recruitment gradually opened to people of all backgrounds. The movement was supported by SOS Racisme. Jo Dalton took over its leadership in 1988.

From 1988 onward, the rapid spread of youth gangs in the Paris suburbs made it difficult for the founders to keep control of the movement. Young people claimed the Black Dragons name without officially belonging to the group, which blurred its image. Moreover, the imprisonment of Yves "le Vent" deprived the movement of its founder, and the Black Dragons gradually abandoned their original commitment to focus on fights with rival gangs.

A conflict with the Requins Juniors gang broke out in the spring of 1989 after a female member of the Black Dragons was raped by members of that gang, leading to a series of knife and gun fights, mostly at Les Halles. These fights left several people seriously injured. The rivalry between the Black Dragons and the Requins Juniors structured the landscape of Parisian gangs in the late 1980s, with each side rallying allied gangs. The Black Dragons' side included the Fight Boys, the Bourreurs Boys, the Cobras and the Criminal Syndicate; the Requins Juniors' side included the Mendy, the Black Fist and the Crime Killers Crew.

In July 1990, a pitched battle involving nearly 200 young people – members of the Mendy, the Requins Juniors, the Black Unis, the Black Dragons and various other groups – took place on the esplanade of La Défense. A member of the Mendy died of his injuries. 17 members of the Black Dragons were arrested by the police. Five years later, a member of the Black Dragons stood trial for the killing and was acquitted.

In 1996, a gang rape case involved members of the Black Dragons Juniors, a successor organization to the Black Dragons. Nine of the perpetrators were tried before the juvenile assize court in June 2003 and sentenced to up to five years in prison. Three others were tried in October 2003 for failure to assist a person in danger and sentenced to six months in prison.

The conflicts between gangs and the resulting legal cases led to the decline and eventual dissolution of the Black Dragons.

== Organization ==
In 1990, according to journalist Philippe Broussard, the Black Dragons had around 50 active members and about 100 sympathizers. Journalists Patrick Louis and Laurent Prinaz, for their part, put their number at over 600 members across France and as far as the French West Indies, 300 of them in the Paris region. They were divided into patrols covering different sectors of the Paris region – the Praying Mantises, the Kamikazes, the Lions and the Tigers. Broussard described the movement at the time as "the largest and best-structured" gang in the Paris region. According to researcher Mike Gadras, they were the only movement of this kind in Europe, present only in France.

To join the Black Dragons, applicants were required to be physically fit, to practice martial arts daily, to show absolute loyalty to the other members, and to abstain from alcohol and tobacco. Admission also involved several initiation rites: knowing and respecting the group's code, respecting the hierarchy, and what members called a "blood pact", earned by taking part in fights with skinheads. According to Anne Giudicelli, however, this body of rules appeared late, in response to growing excesses, and several members said they had never seen it. Some members also reportedly paid little heed to the founder's authority.

The esplanade of La Défense

Training sessions were held in Parc André-Malraux and supervised by instructors who were members of the movement. For many years, the esplanade of La Défense was their main territory. The Black Dragons also occupied other key locations in Paris, notably the Châtelet–Les Halles station and the Gare d'Austerlitz. After La Défense, the Black Dragons fell back on Montreuil and Vitry-sur-Seine.

While inspired by the hip-hop fashion of the Zulu Nation, the Black Dragons were also recognizable by their bomber jackets, patches and Dr. Martens boots, an outfit they claimed to have taken from their skinhead opponents after defeating them in fights.

== Philosophy ==
A Chinese black dragon

In their most visible aspects, the Black Dragons drew on the Black Panthers for their organization and their methods of action in public space, and on the thought of the Zulu Nation. The word "black" took its meaning from the context of African-American emancipation through the emergence of hip-hop and from references to African roots, notably the figure of Mandja, Bantu or Zulu warriors. Jo Dalton explained in this regard that in the Western world the color black only carries negative connotations, and that members of the movement had "the right to identify with something else". The "dragon" refers to Chinese mythology, in which the Black Dragon is regarded as a prestigious symbol. The Black Dragons drew from it a symbolic representation based on mastery of the elements and the maintenance of cosmic balance. The practice of martial arts was as much a way of grasping the spirit of the dragon as a way of staying connected to others and to the world. Members also regularly practiced meditation, seeking not to commit injustice and to defend the weakest.
