= Leonard Pitts =

American commentator, journalist, and novelist (born 1957)

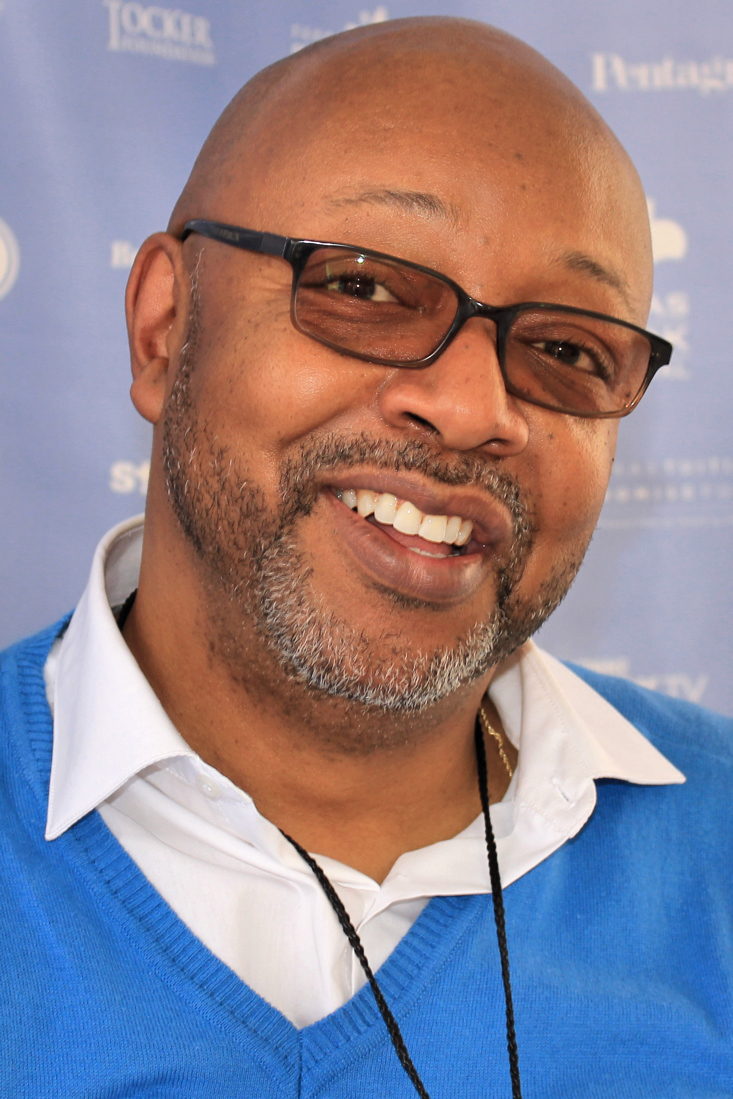
- Pitts at 2015 Texas Book Festival
- Born: October 11, 1957 (age 69); Orange, California, U.S.
- Education: University of Southern California
- Occupations: Commentator; journalist; novelist; columnist

Leonard Garvey Pitts Jr. (born October 11, 1957) is an American commentator, journalist, and novelist. He is a nationally syndicated columnist and winner of the 2004 Pulitzer Prize for Commentary. He was originally hired by the Miami Herald to critique music, but quickly received his own column, in which he has dealt extensively with race, politics, and culture from a progressive perspective.

Raised in Los Angeles and educated at the University of Southern California, Pitts currently lives in Bowie, Maryland. He has won awards for his writing from the Society of Professional Journalists, the American Society of Newspaper Editors, and the National Association of Black Journalists, and he was first nominated for the Pulitzer Prize in 1993, eventually claiming the honor in 2004.

Pitts' first book, Becoming Dad: Black Men and the Journey to Fatherhood, was published in 2006. His first novel, Before I Forget, was released in March 2009, and earned a starred review from Publishers Weekly. The novel centers on a faded soul singer whose early-onset Alzheimer's disease compels him to reconnect with his father and son. Pitts's third book, Forward from This Moment: Selected Columns, 1994–2008, was published in August 2009. It is a selection of his columns from the Miami Herald.

Pitts gained national recognition for his widely circulated column of September 12, 2001, "We'll go forward from this moment", in which he described the toughness of the American spirit in the face of the September 11 attacks.

== Controversy ==
In June 2007, Pitts was the subject of a campaign of death threats and harassment, including neo-Nazi Bill White, who were angry at a column he wrote about the murders of Channon Christian and Christopher Newsom, a white couple who were raped and murdered by five black assailants in Knoxville, Tennessee. In his column addressing the murders, Pitts wrote:

I am [...] unkindly disposed toward the crackpots, incendiaries and flat-out racists who have chosen this tragedy upon which to take an obscene and ludicrous stand. I have four words for them and any other white Americans who feel themselves similarly victimized. Cry me a river.

More death threats were made in April 2008 before his appearance at the University of Puget Sound.

== Books ==
=== Non-fiction ===
- Becoming Dad: Black Men and the Journey to Fatherhood. Agate Bolden. 2006. ISBN 978-1-932841-17-6.
- Pitts, Leonard (2009). Forward from This Moment: Selected Columns, 1994-2008. Agate. ISBN 978-1-932841-32-9.

=== Fiction ===
- Before I Forget. Chicago: Agate Bolden. 2009. ISBN 978-1-932841-43-5.
- Freeman. Chicago: Agate Bolden. 2012. ISBN 978-1-932841-64-0.
- Grant Park. Chicago: Agate Bolden. 2015. ISBN 978-1-932841-91-6.
- The Last Thing You Surrender. Chicago: Agate Bolden. 2019. ISBN 978-1-572842-45-8.
