= Skin (2018 feature film) =

2018 film by Guy Nattiv

- Theatrical release poster
- Directed by: Guy Nattiv
- Written by: Guy Nattiv
- Produced by: Guy Nattiv; Jaime Ray Newman; Oren Moverman; Dillon D. Jordan; Celine Rattray; Trudie Styler
- Starring: Jamie Bell; Danielle Macdonald; Daniel Henshall; Bill Camp; Ari Barkan; Louisa Krause; Zoe Colletti; Kylie Rogers; Colbi Gannett; Mike Colter; Vera Farmiga
- Cinematography: Arnaud Potier
- Edited by: Lee Percy; Michael Taylor
- Music by: Dan Romer
- Production companies: Voltage Pictures; Maven Pictures; PaperChase Films; Lost Lane Entertainment; Item 7; Sight Unseen Pictures; Studio Mao (In association with)
- Distributed by: A24; DirecTV Cinema
- Release dates: September 8, 2018 (TIFF); July 26, 2019 (United States)
- Running time: 110 minutes
- Country: United States
- Language: English
- Box office: $135,562

Skin is a 2018 American biographical drama film written and directed by Guy Nattiv. The film stars Jamie Bell, Danielle Macdonald, Daniel Henshall, Bill Camp, Louisa Krause, Zoe Colletti, Kylie Rogers, Colbi Gannett, Mike Colter, and Vera Farmiga. The film is inspired by and loosely based on the true story of an American neo-Nazi skinhead named Bryon Widner.

Skin had its world premiere at the 2018 Toronto International Film Festival on September 8, 2018 and was released on June 27, 2019 through DirecTV Cinema before a wide release on July 26, 2019 by A24.

== Plot ==
In 2009, tattoo-covered Bryon "Babs" Widner lives in Indiana as a member of the Vinlanders Social Club, a white supremacist skinhead community led by Fred Krager and his wife Shareen, who took the orphaned Bryon in as a teenager and raised him as their own. The community is violent and aggressive, even towards each other, but Bryon is fiercely loyal to his "family".

After dumping his girlfriend April, Bryon is arrested for slashing the face of a black 14-year-old who attacked him at a protest that turned violent. Shaken by the words of the teenager's mother who accosts him outside the police station, Bryon starts to become disillusioned with his community as he watches Fred recruit a young man named Gavin.

Bryon falls in love with Julie Price, a single mother of three who is scarred by the memory of her first husband, who was also a neo-Nazi skinhead, beating her children. Julie is wary of Bryon, but falls in love with him.

In the middle of the night, the Vinlanders call Bryon to a "meeting", which causes Julie to lose her trust in him and leave. The "meeting" turns out to be a mission to burn down a mosque. Bryon sees a group of young men sleeping there, who he silently instructs to escape before the fire is lit. After this, he considers seeking help from Daryle Lamont Jenkins, an activist who exposes white supremacists to the public and offers to help them leave extremism behind.

After gaining her trust again by vowing to quit, Bryon marries Julie and settles in Fort Wayne, Indiana, taking a job as a manual laborer due to his history with Nazism preventing him from seeking a better-paying job.

Bryon comes home one day to find the Vinlanders in his home. He ushers Julie and the kids out of the house, and Fred and Shareen tell him that he cannot leave his family. Bryon protests, but is taken along to a scrap yard, where he is urged to kill the young Muslims that the Vinlanders suspect he helped to escape. He refuses, and enters a scuffle with a member named Slayer, who shoots him in the stomach and stabs the Muslims to death with a screwdriver. Slayer then attempts to turn on Fred, and Gavin shoots and kills him. Fred and Shareen intimidate Bryon as he recovers in the hospital.

Bryon meets with Jenkins, who arranges for his entry into the FBI’s witness protection program. While in hiding, the Vinlanders ambush Bryon’s home in the night, shooting at the house while Julie—now pregnant—and her children are inside. The following morning, Bryon discovers his dog, Boss, hanging from a tree. He and his new family cry together as they drive away.

While staying at a hotel, Bryon spots a tattoo of the Norse god Freyja on one of Julie's daughters, who had been manipulated by Shareen into telling the Vinlanders where they lived. Bryon flies into a rage while interrogating her about her tattoo, and Julie and a bystander rush to intervene. Bryon beats the bystander, and Julie tells him to leave forever.

Heartbroken and depressed, Bryon agrees to undergo two years of surgeries to remove the tattoos covering his face and hands in exchange for volunteering information about the Vinlanders to the FBI. The FBI ambush the Vinlanders' compound, arresting Fred and Shareen and killing Gavin. After Bryon recovers, he goes to visit Julie and sees his child that they conceived, now a baby.

== Cast ==
- Jamie Bell as Bryon "Babs" Widner
  - Tyler Williamson as young Bryon Widner
- Vera Farmiga as Shareen "Ma" Krager
- Danielle Macdonald as Julie Price
- Mike Colter as Daryle Lamont Jenkins
- Bill Camp as Fred "Hammer / Pa" Krager
- Mary Stuart Masterson as Jackie Marks
- Daniel Henshall as Slayer
- Ari Barkan as Bulldog
- Justin Wilson as Mike
- Scott Thomas as Sean
- Michael Villar as Jerry
- Rob Figueroa as Prophet
- Russel Posner as Gavin
- Louisa Krause as April
- Zoe Colletti as Desiree
- Kylie Rogers as Sierra
- Colbi Gannett as Iggy
- Jaime Ray Newman as Nurse Melissa Frye
- Jenna Leigh Green as Rebecca Ramos

== Production ==
On May 11, 2017, international rights to Skin was bought by Seville International at the 70th Cannes Film Festival. In August 2018, it was reported that composer Dan Romer would be scoring the music for the feature.

In May 2017, it was announced that Jamie Bell and Danielle Macdonald would star in the film, with Nattiv writing the screenplay, producing and directing. In March 2018, after production on the film had started, Vera Farmiga was announced to have joined the cast of the film, with Nattiv's wife Jaime Ray Newman reported to be producing. That same month, Mike Colter was cast as Daryle Lamont Jenkins, founder of the One People's Project. Shortly thereafter, actors Ari Barkan, Scott Thomas, Daniel Henshall, Michael Villar, Justin Wilson, and Russel Posner joined the cast.

Principal photography began in January 2018 in Kingston, New York, and was completed in March 2018.

== Release ==
Skin had its world premiere at the Toronto International Film Festival on September 8, 2018. Shortly after, A24 and DirecTV Cinema acquired distribution rights to the film. It was released through DirecTV Cinema on June 27, 2019, and had a limited release on July 26, 2019.

== Reception ==
=== Critical response ===
Skin holds a 76% approval rating on review aggregator website Rotten Tomatoes, based on 80 reviews, with an average of 6.6/10. The site's consensus reads: "Skin could stand to go a bit deeper below its surface, but a worthy story and a committed performance from Jamie Bell make this timely drama well worth a watch." On Metacritic, the film holds a rating of 58 out of 100, based on 20 critics, indicating "mixed or average reviews".
