= Skinheads Against Racial Prejudice =

Group of skinheads opposing racism

Logo featuring a Corinthian helmet, commonly used by those associated with SHARP

Skinheads Against Racial Prejudice (SHARP) are anti-racist skinheads who oppose white power skinheads, neo-fascists and racism within the skinhead community, particularly if they identify themselves as skinheads. SHARPs claim to reclaim the original multicultural identity of the original skinheads, hijacked by white power skinheads, who they sometimes deride as "boneheads".

SHARP professes no political ideology or affiliation beyond the common opposition to racism. The group stresses the importance of the black Jamaican influence in the original late-1960s skinhead movement, much akin to Trojan skinheads.

== History ==
=== Background ===
The original skinhead subculture started in the United Kingdom in the late 1960s, and had heavy British mod and Jamaican rude boy influences, including a love for ska and soul music. Although some skinheads (including black skinheads) had engaged in "Paki bashing" (random violence against Pakistanis and other South Asian immigrants), skinheads were not associated with an organized racist political movement in the 1960s. However, in the late 1970s, a skinhead revival in the UK included a sizable white nationalist faction, involving organizations such as the National Front, British Movement, Rock Against Communism and in the late eighties Blood and Honour. Because of this, the mainstream media began to label the whole skinhead identity as neo-fascist. This new white power skinhead movement then spread to other countries, including the United States.

=== Emergence ===
White power skinheads and other white supremacists have used this symbol, along with many other hate symbols, in opposition to SHARP.

Skinheads Against Racial Prejudice was founded in 1987 by Marcus Pacheco, a skinhead from New York City. It emerged as a response by suburban adolescents to the bigotry of the growing white power movement in 1982. Traditional skinheads (trads) formed as a way to show that the skinhead subculture was not based on racism and political extremism. NYC Oi! band The Press and Jason O'Toole (vocalist of the hardcore punk group Life's Blood) were among SHARP's early supporters. In 1989, Roddy Moreno of the Welsh Oi! band The Oppressed visited New York City and met a few SHARP members. On his return to the United Kingdom, he designed a new SHARP logo based on the Trojan Reggae labels design and started promoting SHARP ideals to British skinheads.

SHARP then spread throughout Europe and in other continents. In the UK and other European countries, the SHARP attitude was more based on the individual than on organized groups. In the 2000s, SHARP is thought to have become more of an individual designation than an official organization.

Skinheads, especially in the United States and ASEAN countries like Malaysia, Singapore and Indonesia align themselves with groups and organizations to this day. Most of these would designate themselves as crews. Many strive for an individualist presentation with collectivist goals. As well they are generally imposed into community service, protesting, activism both violent and peaceful. SHARPs often take part of local mutual aid or activist groups such as Black Lives Matter or Anti-Racist Action, in which the latter was even in part founded by skinheads, the most well known of which being Mic Crenshaw.

In the late-1980s, a SHARP community emerged in Portland, Oregon in the wake of increased activity from white power skinhead groups such as White Aryan Resistance (WAR) and local affiliates such as East Side White Pride. The racially-motivated murder of Ethiopian student Mulugeta Seraw by members of the groups was credited as having sparked the anti-racist skinhead movement in the city

The United States SHARPs scene has been entirely agitated by the racist overture and have resorted to all forms of anti-racism and anti-fascism to redeem their style and culture.

Violence has been rampant within either of the skinhead factions for decades now. Between fighting in clubs and venues as well as the streets, from mosh pit shuffles to murder. The American scene has been alive and vibrant since the 1980s. Some of the most well known anti-racist skinhead crews include The Baldies Syndicate and American S.H.A.R.P (colloquially known as A.M.S). Additional groups maintain active membership globally.

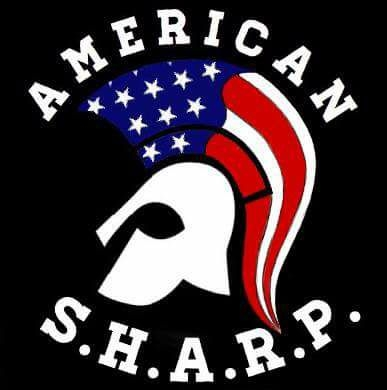
American Skinheads Against Racial Prejudice logo

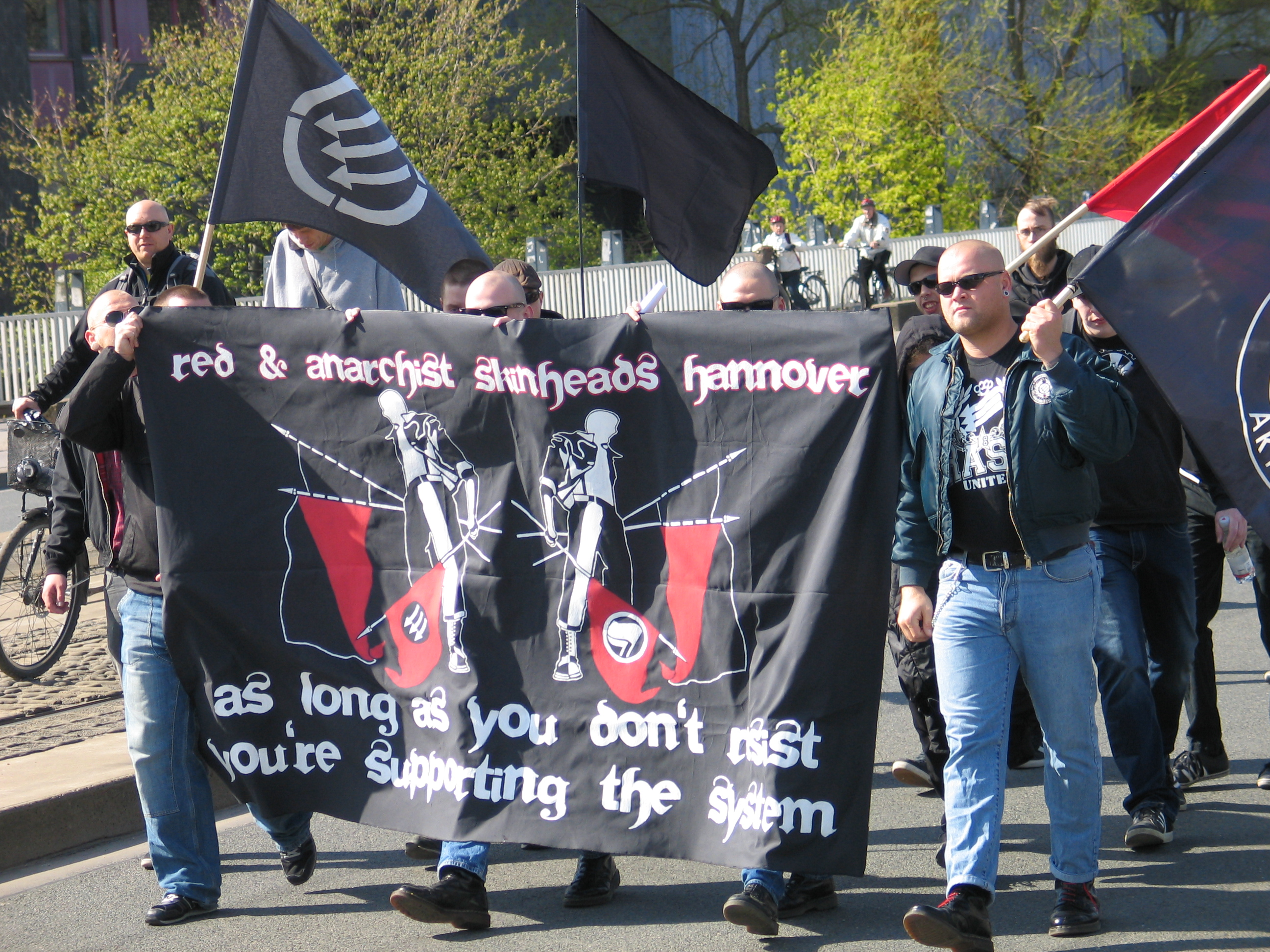
Anarchist, anti-fascist and anti-racist skinheads in Hannover, Germany

Many people may confuse SHARP members with racists, since their appearance is superficially similar: shaved heads, denim, lace up boots, button-down shirts and suspenders (called braces). One glib differentiation that might be imagined to separate the two would be music interests. SHARPs may listen to culturally influenced music such as soul, reggae and ska, but also punk, hardcore and Oi!. Racist skinheads would disagree with some or all of these musical choices, but may listen to punk, hardcore, Oi!, as well as Nazi punk and National Socialist black metal.

In a deliberate attempt to reject the growing racist subculture, since the early 1980s SHARPs promulgated an anti-racist identity through small amateur fanzine publications like Hard As Nails. During the pre-Internet era, these publication established a network of like-minded individuals with similar musical and stylistic attitudes, who considered anti-racism an indispensable part of a living skinhead scene. Another strand of the same trad revival sought to affirm explicit links with the foundation of mod subculture and its apolitical, black-positive standards of fashion. The scooter scene, with its runs and Northern Soul dances, had never gone entirely away; and in the post-punk rediscovery of the past, under the influence of The Jam and Quadrophenia, it seemed a fresh and self-renewing direction for skinhead itself to go in.

By 1989, this trad scene was ripe for the injection of a cultural influence like SHARP, much as its own appearance had been symptomatic of an American internal revolution in US skinheads' attitudes to race and their own subculture.

An outgrowth of SHARP, Red and Anarchist Skinheads (RASH), formed in the United States in 1993 against anti-gay sentiment in the non-racist skinhead community.

== Image ==
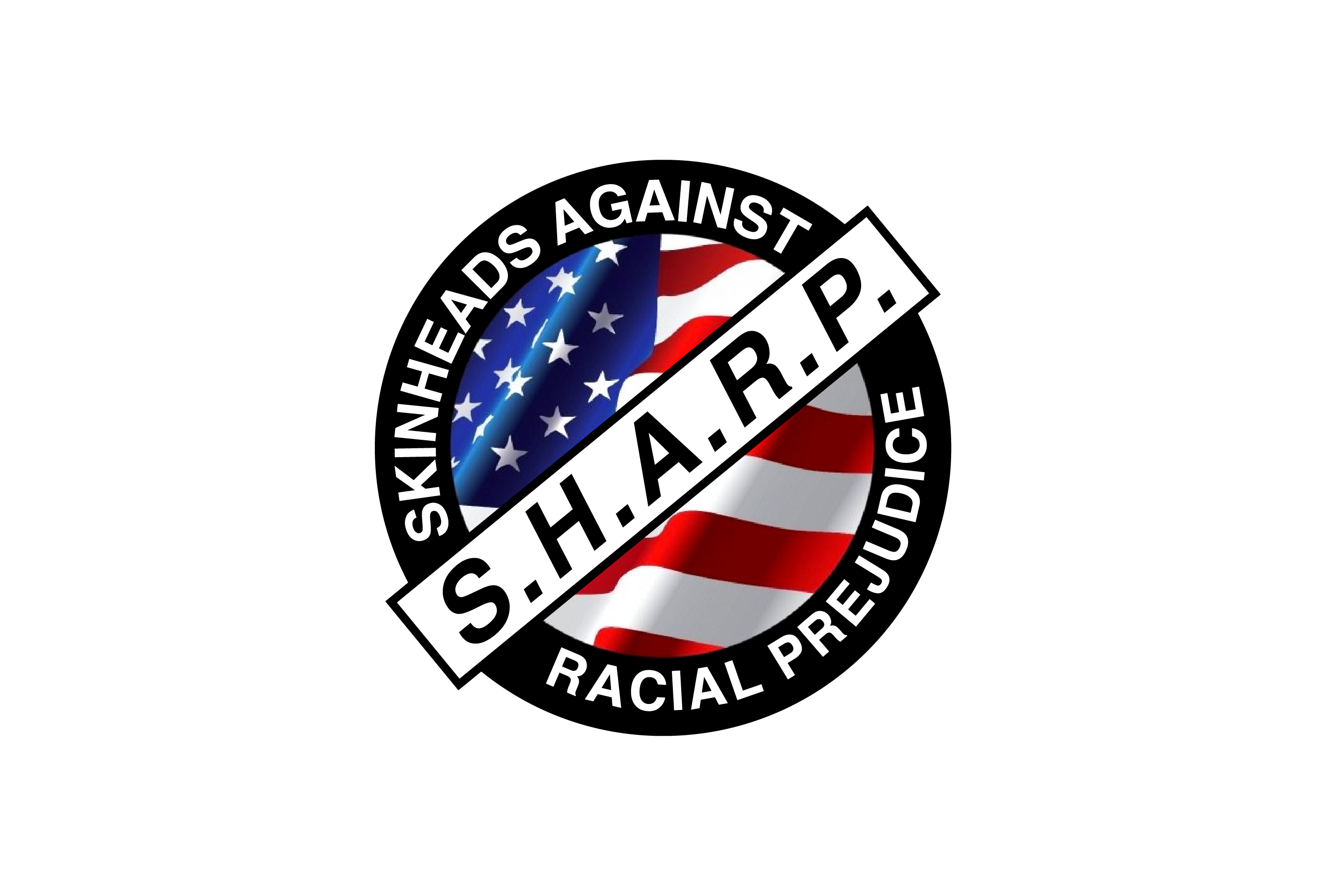
Original logo of SHARP

The original logo was an American flag surrounded by the SHARP lettering. The second SHARP logo is based on the logo of Trojan Records, which originally mainly released black Jamaican ska, rocksteady, and reggae artists. Some variants of this design also incorporate the checkerboard motif of 2 Tone Records, known for its multiracial roster of ska- and reggae-influenced bands.

The way in which SHARPs dress is meant to project an image perceived as hard and smart, in an evolving continuity with style ideals established in the middle-to-late 1960s. This style and demeanour originated from the UK, growing out of the pre-existing mod movement, taking cues and influences from Jamaican ska and rude boy culture. They intend to remain true to the style's original purpose of enjoying life, clothes, attitude and music.

== See also ==
- Love Music Hate Racism
- Rock Against Racism
- Hardcore skinhead
- Working class
- Iron Front
- The Press
- Assassination of Guillem Agulló
