= David Yeagley =

American classical composer

- Born: September 5, 1951; Oklahoma City, Oklahoma, United States
- Died: March 11, 2014 (aged 62); United States
- Education: Yale Divinity School
- Occupations: Writer, activist

David Yeagley (September 5, 1951 – March 11, 2014) was a Comanche, classical composer, conservative political writer and activist. He was born in Oklahoma City, Oklahoma. He earned a bachelor's degree from Oberlin Conservatory, a Master of Arts from Emory University, an Artist Diploma from the University of Hartford (Hartt School of Music), and a Doctorate from the University of Arizona. He was the first American Indian ever admitted to Yale Divinity School, where he earned a Master of Divinity degree.

Yeagley wrote for the right-wing online FrontPage Magazine.

In 2011, Yeagley filed a lawsuit against the organization One People's Project for participating in actions that allegedly led to the cancellation of an American Renaissance conference in 2010 where he was scheduled to speak.
