= Mic Crenshaw =

American recording artist

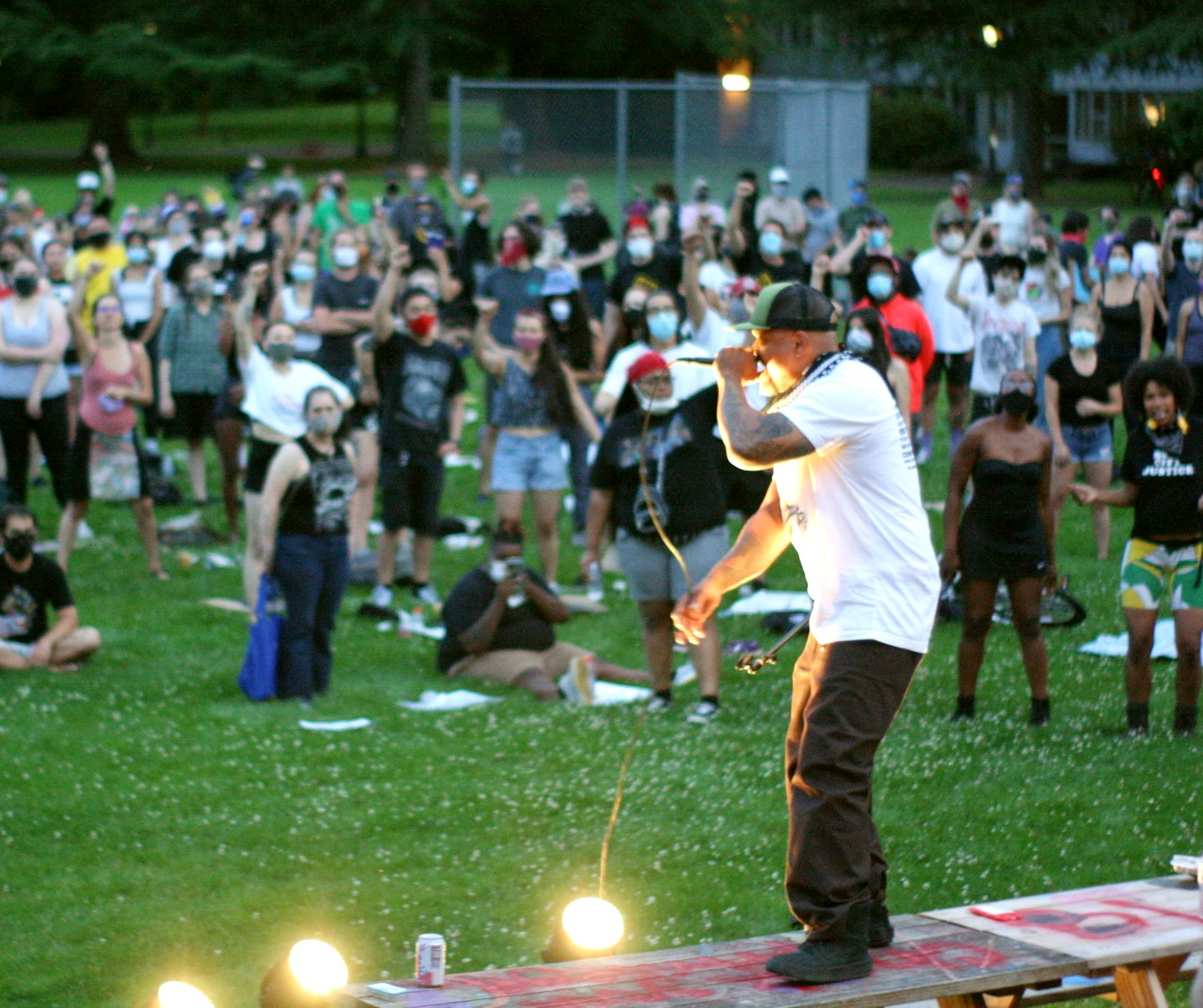
- Mic Crenshaw performing at Black Lives Matter demonstration at Reed College

Background information
- Born: 1970 (age 55–56); Chicago, Illinois, U.S.
- Origin: United States
- Occupations: Recording artist, political activist, and educator

Mic Crenshaw (born 1970) is an American recording artist, political activist, and educator living in Portland in the U.S. state of Oregon.

== Biography ==
Crenshaw was born on the South Side of Chicago in 1970. He graduated high school in Minneapolis, Minnesota, where he argued for social equity and racial justice. In 1992, he moved to Portland, Oregon to focus his anti-racist activism into music and music education. Over the last twenty years he has recorded and produced more than ten albums. Crenshaw recorded and performed with Dead Prez and Immortal Technique, and in 1994 formed the Portland-based hip hop group Hungry Mob as its frontman. In 2001, he won the Portland Poetry Slam and finished as a national finalist. He served as co-manager of KBOO Community Radio twice.

== Activism ==
In his teenage years, Crenshaw confronted white supremacist gangs as a founding member of Anti-Racist Action. He co-founded GlobalFam, a non-profit project to create and maintain a computer center for young people in Burundi. Crenshaw uses music to critique American law enforcement as a system that perpetuates brutality against black and brown people. Crenshaw partnered with Education Without Borders (NGO), which supports education, music and art initiatives such as Books to Prisoners. He works with the Black Lives Matter movement and acts as the Political Director of Hip Hop Congress.

In 2004, Mic Crenshaw attended the Economic Justice and Youth Empowerment conference in Rwanda. In 2013, Mic Crenshaw worked with a global group of artists to found Afrikan Hip Hop Caravan, which goes on annual performance tours in Eastern and Southern Africa. During 2013–2015, the Caravan toured a live performance set in Cape Town, South Africa, Harare, Zimbabwe; Arusha, Tanzania; and Nairobi, Kenya. In 2014, Afrikan Hip Hop Caravan produced "Afrikan Hiphop Caravan Collaborations" with Soundz Of the South. Crenshaw is the lead organizer of Afrikan Hip Hop Caravan in the United States.

In 2017, Crenshaw recorded the album Last of a Dying Breed with Micah Fletcher, a survivor of a 2017 Portland train attack in which two others were murdered.

While serving as an artist-in-residence at Benson Polytechnic High School, Crenshaw was awarded a $100,000 fellowship from the Fred W. Fields Fund, to help Oregonians "understand the impact of the opportunity gap on families and communities, inspiring people to help solve it."

In 2020, Crenshaw performed at several George Floyd protests in Portland, Oregon, including Juneteenth in Oregon. During Black History Month 2022, Crenshaw performed with Mt. Olivet Baptist Church Gospel Ensemble in Portland.

Crenshaw co-hosted the KBOO 11 episode podcast series "It Did Happen Here" in 2020. The podcast traced the roots of Portland community-based anti-racist organizing in the 1980s and '90s to the anti-racist group "The Baldies" in Crenshaw's native Minneapolis, and explored the context and aftermath of the 1989 murder of Ethiopian immigrant Mulugeta Seraw. The producers were interviewed about the podcast in an Oregon Historical Society event in 2021. He was also featured in an episode of Minnesota Public Broadcasting's "Minnesota Experience" about the Baldies.
