= Clark Martell =

American neo-Nazi

Clark Reid Martell (born December 23, 1959) is an American white supremacist and the former leader of Chicago Area SkinHeads (CASH), which was founded in 1985 by six skinheads under his leadership. This was the first organized neo-Nazi white power skinhead group in the United States. The group was also called Romantic Violence (a name shared with a rock band fronted by Martell), and was the first US distributor of records and tapes from the English band Skrewdriver.

The Southern Poverty Law Center has described his activity in the mid-1980s as making him "a skinhead Johnny Appleseed" for recruitment to the racist skinhead movement. Among the members he recruited were his successor as CASH leader - and later anti-extremism activist - Christian Picciolini. Martell had formerly been a member of the American Nazi Party, and in 1979 he received a four year prison sentence for the attempted firebombing of a Hispanic family's home in Cicero, Illinois, serving 30 months.

In June 1989, Martell was sentenced to 11 years in prison for beating up a 20-year-old woman who quit a neo-Nazi group and allegedly had black friends. He drew a swastika and the words "RACE TRAITOR" on the wall using her blood. While in prison, he appeared in an episode of The Oprah Winfrey Show via phone connection, stating his views on white nationalism. Martell was released from prison in 1992 after a different conviction contributing to his sentence was overturned.
