= Bill White (neo-Nazi) =

American neo-Nazi (born 1977)

William Alexander White (born May 29, 1977) is an American neo-Nazi. He is the former leader of the American National Socialist Workers' Party, and former administrator of Overthrow.com, a now-defunct website dedicated to racist and antisemitic content.

White came to public attention in 1996 in a front-page article in The Washington Post after he posted allegations about the stepmother of a girl he said was being abused. In 1999 he expressed support for Eric Harris and Dylan Klebold, killers of twelve students and a teacher in the Columbine High School massacre, because according to White, they were being oppressed by the United States education system. In 2005, The New York Times quoted White as having "laughed" when United States district court judge Joan Lefkow's husband and mother were murdered. He told The Roanoke Times that he looked forward to "further killings of Jews and their sympathizers." White is skeptical of the Holocaust, saying "claims that ... the gas chambers were part of a 'Holocaust' of 'six million,' were invented almost entirely by the Soviet Union, and were later adopted by the Jewish communities of the Western nations." The Anti-Defamation League quotes White saying "there was no Holocaust" and describes what it calls "White's Holocaust denial rhetoric".

In 2008, White was arrested for alleged threats to a federal juror. On December 18, 2009, White was found guilty on four counts, one of which was later dismissed by the judge. In 2010 the American Civil Liberties Union filed a brief asking the court to reverse White's convictions on those three charges. A federal district court overturned the convictions on First Amendment grounds and White was released in April 2011. In 2012, the prosecution appealed the decision and White fled the country, violating his supervised release, and was arrested in Mexico. He is in prison as of 2021 - barring any present or near-term future pardons or early release decisions, White will be in prison until he is almost 60 years old.

== Background ==
White was raised in the Horizon Hill neighborhood of Rockville, Maryland. According to an April 1999 interview with The Washington Times, he began to drift toward anarchism after reading The Communist Manifesto at 13. He attended Walt Whitman High School in Bethesda, Maryland, where he founded the Utopian Anarchist Party (UAP) and published a magazine that focused on opposition to the education system, psychiatry, and law enforcement.

White graduated from Walt Whitman High School in June 1994. He became a psychology major at the University of Maryland, College Park where, in 1995, he started another political group called the Bill White Student Group, a continuation of the UAP. He founded Overthrow.com as the group's website where he published material from a wide range of political viewpoints, including communism, anarchism, and fascism. In 1995, White faced criminal charges of possessing deadly weapons, a knife and a club, distributing obscene material, and attempting to escape from police custody, arising out of the distribution of political leaflets. In 1997, White served seven months in the Montgomery County Detention Center on weapons, assault and resisting arrest charges.

On February 14, 1996, White was featured in a front-page story in The Washington Post after posting on Internet news groups the name and telephone number of a woman he believed was abusing her daughter. The supposed victim had allegedly told a university counseling group that her parents would not allow her to use the telephone or see friends; someone from the group spread the story, and White posted it, asking readers to telephone the mother and "tell her you are disgusted and you demand that she stops." The Post reported that the mother and stepfather were near breaking point after receiving threatening telephone calls.

== Columbine High School massacre ==
On April 20, 1999, Eric Harris and Dylan Klebold, seniors at Columbine High School near Littleton, Colorado, killed twelve students and one teacher before committing suicide. White's website claimed that "schools and juvenile psychiatric centers [that]...prescribe anti-depressants are evil and should be destroyed," and it gave a list of "Music to Shoot Your School Up By." The report continued that "[t]here are so many parallels between the Web site's message and the April 20 massacre in Columbine High School in Littleton, Colorado, that some police hate-crime experts say privately it is not inconceivable that the two teen-age gunmen in that case visited the site." FBI officials claimed there was no indication that the website had any connection to the shooting.

White told Reuters that "the reason [Columbine victims] got killed is that they are part of an authoritarian social movement and were seen by the killers as symbolic of that movement ... What the shooters were shooting at was not people but the movements they symbolized. It's a shame that authoritarian Christians, who are trying to dominate our society, don't have a clue how objectionable they are until people start shooting them." He said he would neither confirm nor deny that what he called a "Colorado cell" of his Utopian Anarchist Party had been in contact with the teenagers before the shooting.

White later clarified his position on Columbine in an interview with Jack Ross for Pravda Online:

People were predictably outraged, and let me be clear that I sympathize with what they did — I don't support it or think it was necessarily the "right" thing to do. What I said was that the public school system is actively involved in hurting youth, that it is psychologically destructive to them, and that the necessary effect of the evil violence the public schools do on a massive scale is evil violence directed back at them and the people and institutions which symbolize them.

== Ideological shifts ==
Though most noted for his support of fascist movements, White has proclaimed multiple intense and conflicting political shifts across the political spectrum, ranging from communism to conservatism.

From 1997 to 1998, White claimed involvement with the Maoist Revolutionary Communist Party's Refuse and Resist, Coalition against Police Brutality, and the Trotskyist International Socialist Organization (ISO). White worked as a columnist for the Russian website Pravda Online, which took its name from the newspaper of the Communist Party of the Soviet Union. In 2000, White joined Ross Perot's Reform Party and the campaign to elect Pat Buchanan, then running for President of the United States on a Reform Party ticket. White later told American Free Press that he resigned from the Buchanan campaign after a few months out of concern for what he called the campaign's "dishonest practices."

== Business interests ==
White set up an online auction website called "ShopWhite" with the aim of capturing the White Power music and paraphernalia market from eBay, but the venture failed after security and administrative problems.

In late 2003, White moved to Roanoke, Virginia, where he began trading as White Homes and Land LLC. According to The Roanoke Times and the Southern Poverty Law Center, White has owned nine single and multi-family properties in an impoverished black neighborhood in southwest Roanoke since April 2004. White told the Roanoke Times in 2004 that he was not a racist or Nazi. He admitted to being an antisemite: "I wouldn't be out here buying and fixing up houses if I had some agenda against the black community...The Jews, I despise. They hate me. I hate them." He acknowledged calling some Roanoke residents "local nig-rats" and accused them of "conspiring to test me."

== Intimidation and activism ==
On October 15, 2005, White helped the National Socialist Movement organize a march and rally in Toledo, Ohio. The march was canceled by police when the NSM and around 20 supporters were outnumbered by several hundred anti-racists and members of the largely African-American neighborhood in which the rally was to take place. White, the NSM's Dayton leader Mark Martin, and the rest of their supporters taunted the crowd with racial epithets. Some counter-protesters became violent and began rioting. More than 100 people were arrested.

In 2005, he also attended a small rally in Yorktown, Virginia. He served as a spokesman for a 2006 neo-Nazi march at the capitol in Lansing, Michigan.

In July 2006, White was removed from the NSM and formed the internet-based American National Socialist Workers' Party. On April 19, 2007, two of the ANSWP's fifteen members were arrested when they unveiled a swastika flag during a speech by President George W. Bush in Tipp City, Ohio. On May 23, 2007, White mailed letters and copies of National Socialist, the ANSWP magazine, to the residents of an apartment complex in Virginia Beach, Virginia where tenants had complained about discriminatory behavior by their landlord.

=== Access to White's websites in Canada ===
In 2006, Canadian human rights lawyer Richard Warman and the Canadian Jewish Congress asked the Canadian Radio-television and Telecommunications Commission, Canada's telecommunications regulator, to block access in Canada to White's websites. Warman claimed the websites contained material intended to incite violence against him that caused him to fear for his life.

=== Jena Six ===
On September 22, 2007, the FBI opened an investigation of Overthrow.com because it listed the addresses of five of the Jena Six and the telephone numbers of family members "in case anyone wants to deliver justice." According to an FBI spokeswoman, the website "essentially called for their lynching." Al Sharpton claimed that some of the families have continuously received threatening and harassing phone calls.

=== Roanoke, Virginia attack ===
In October 2007, White was attacked by Aries Brown and Lattoria Minnis, two African-Americans whose claims that White had assaulted them were dismissed by a judge. During the trial, White testified that he choked Brown unconscious during the incident. He later published an essay, "Transcendence and the Killing of the Wicked," describing the experience.

== Federal trials and convictions ==
On October 17, 2008, White was arrested in Roanoke, Virginia by the FBI. The arrest stemmed from an alleged threat White made against a federal juror involved in the 2004 Matthew F. Hale case and posting the juror's personal information online. White was initially held without bond, but was later granted $25,000 bond due to his lack of convictions and a psychiatrist's assessment that White had narcissistic and histrionic personality disorder but was not a threat to himself or others. Other counts against White, filed December 11, 2008, included alleged threats he made against poor black tenants suing their landlords, and threats against others, including Warman, columnist Leonard Pitts, former South Harrison Township, New Jersey mayor Charles Tyson, and a university administrator from Delaware.

In July 2009, one count of inciting violence was dismissed by the judge. The trial on the seven remaining charges began on December 9, 2009. On December 18, the jury found White guilty on four counts and not guilty on three counts.

On February 8, 2010, a federal judge dismissed White's conviction for threatening Warman. On April 14, 2010, White was sentenced to 30 months imprisonment. Judge James Clinton Turk said he rarely sentences defendants on the high side of guidelines, but did so due to the fear that White had instilled in many of his victims. The conviction for threatening a federal juror was reversed as violating the First Amendment, and White was released in April 2011. The prosecutor appealed the ruling.

On March 1, 2012, a federal appeals court threw out the 30-month sentence White received for making threats and set a new sentencing date for enhanced sentencing since at least one of the victims was a child. Also in March, White was charged and found guilty in General District Court of littering for throwing fliers out of his car. On May 14, White failed to appear at the sentencing hearing and left a note at his apartment that he will not be returning, violating his supervised release. He claimed online he was moving to Iran.

On June 8, 2012, White was arrested by Mexican authorities in Playa del Carmen, Mexico.

In November 2013, White was convicted on three counts of attempting to extort money from his ex-wife, and subsequently sentenced to 92 months in prison.

In September 2014, White was convicted of threats sent to Florida officials, and subsequently sentenced to an extra 210 months prison time.

In April 2021, White submitted a request for "compassionate release" from the Marion Federal Penitentiary, citing alleged mistreatment by the Bureau of Prisons via a 20-page form and 97-page accompanying document. The judge in his case denied the request, and White is scheduled to remain imprisoned until 2037.
