= Daryle Lamont Jenkins =

American political activist (born 1968)

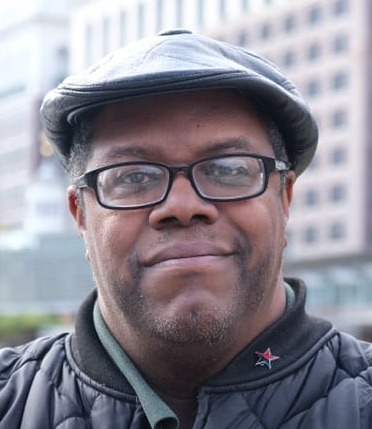
- Jenkins in 2018
- Born: July 22, 1968 (age 58); Newark, New Jersey, U.S.
- Occupation: Activist
- Employer: One People's Project
- Political party: Independent

Daryle Lamont Jenkins (born July 22, 1968) is an American political activist, best known for founding One People's Project, an organization based in New Brunswick, New Jersey. Jenkins serves as its executive director.

== Early life ==
Jenkins was born in Newark, New Jersey and raised in nearby Somerset, New Jersey. He graduated from Franklin High School and served in the United States Air Force. Upon returning from the service, he became a part of the punk rock movement, producing two public access programs about the scene as well as political activism, which caused some conflict with his position as a reporter and an editor for local newspapers.

== Career ==
Jenkins identifies as an anarchist.

Jenkins has been documenting and writing about right-wing individuals and organizations since 1989, while he was still serving in the Air Force as a police officer.

Planned Parenthood sued anti-abortion activist Neal Horsley and others, alleging that their "wanted"-style posters of abortion doctors were a threat. They lost on appeal. Jenkins said in an interview, that when he saw this, he realized the Left could use this tactic as well. He argued that "We didn't see it as a weapon," and further asserted that "We never used it as a threat. We wanted to be open about what we saw and this allowed us to be open."

Jenkins' One People's Project gained a reputation for publicly documenting hate groups, and their activities, Jenkins has also gained a reputation for helping neo-Nazis leave those circles. Jenkins and the project worked with Bryon Widner, whose story as a reformed skinhead was featured in the documentary Erasing Hate (2011) and the motion picture Skin (2018).

Donald Trump's campaign for the presidency and eventual victory put Jenkins, the One People Project, and the entire Antifa movement into the spotlight.

Jenkins has appeared on numerous television news programs, articles, and documentaries, notably The Montel Williams Show, A Current Affair, The Rachel Maddow Show, and on AM Joy with Joy Reid. In 2018, the documentary Alt-Right: Age of Rage, which features Jenkins confronting white nationalist Richard Spencer, premiered at South by Southwest.

In 2024 he released a spoken word on a compilation CD benefit for one people's project, organized by Jason Potbelly. The CD also featured MDC, Potbelly, Hellfish, and Ur Grls.
