= Christian Picciolini =

American former extremist (born 1973)

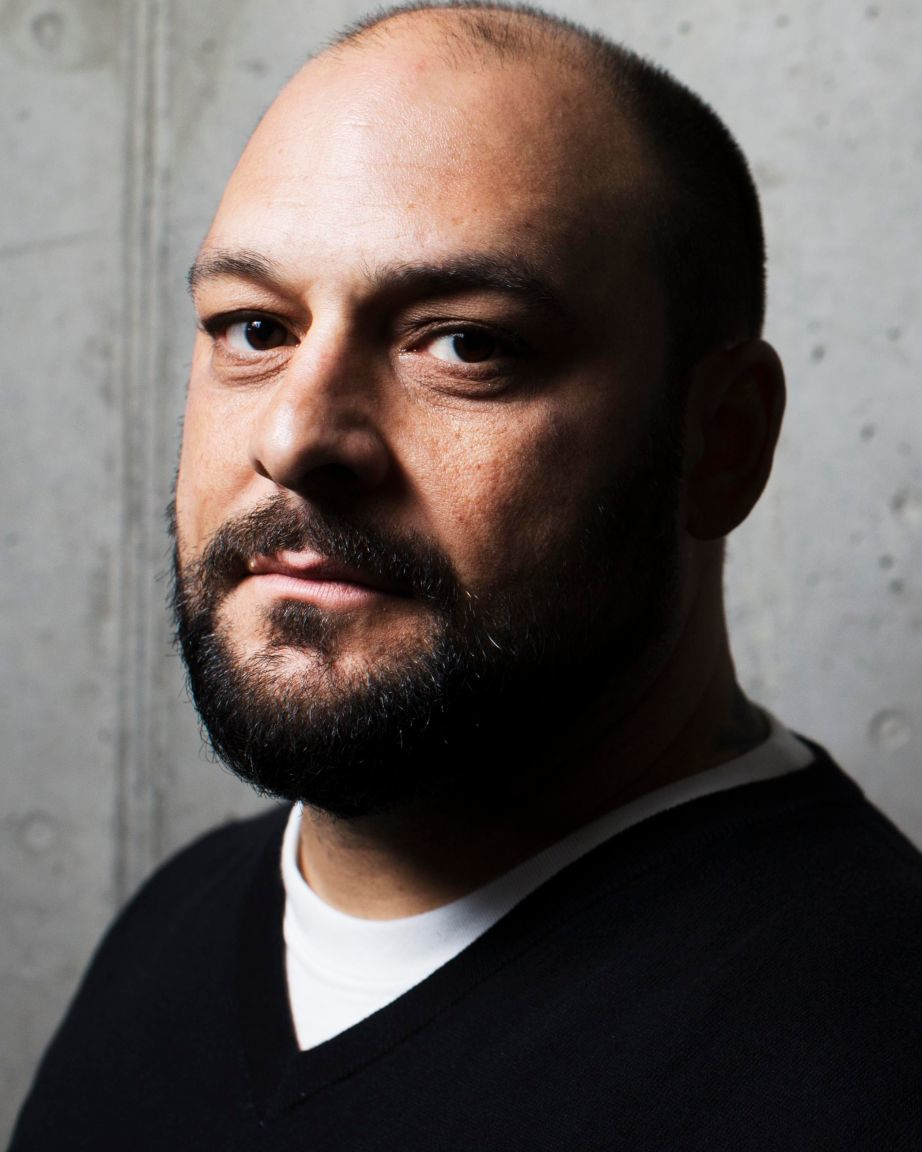
- Picciolini in 2016
- Born: Christian Marco Picciolini; November 3, 1973 (age 52); Blue Island, Illinois, U.S.
- Education: DePaul University (B.A.)
- Occupations: Entrepreneur; business executive; author; musician
- Awards: Emmy Award (regional)
- Website: christianpicciolini.com

Christian Marco Picciolini (born November 3, 1973) is an American former extremist and political activist who founded the Free Radicals Project, a nonprofit organization that works to prevent extremism and support individuals in leaving hate groups. He was also an unsuccessful candidate for Township Supervisor in Resort Township, Michigan, during the 2024 election. He is the author of a memoir, Romantic Violence: Memoirs of an American Skinhead, which details his time as a leader of the white power movement in the U.S. An updated version of the story was published in 2017, titled White American Youth: My Descent into America's Most Violent Hate Movement--and How I Got Out. His book Breaking Hate: Confronting the New Culture of Extremism (2020) looks at how extremists recruit the vulnerable to their causes.

== Early life and education ==
Picciolini was born and raised in Blue Island, Illinois, the son of Italian immigrants. His father was a hair salon owner and his mother was a restaurant owner. At age 14 in 1987, Picciolini was recruited to join the Chicago Area Skinheads (CASH) by the group's founder, Clark Martell. Two years later, after Martell had gone to prison for a second time, Picciolini became the group's leader at age 16. He facilitated a merger between Chicago Area Skinheads and the Hammerskins, a more violent and well-organized white supremacist skinhead organization.

He went on to head the white supremacist punk band, White American Youth (W.A.Y.) and, eventually, a hate rock band called Final Solution. Final Solution was the first American white power skinhead group to perform in Europe. The concert was held in a former cathedral in Weimar, Germany, attended by 4,000 people, and was made up of several other white supremacist bands. In 1994, Picciolini opened a record store called Chaos Records where he primarily sold white power music. He officially renounced ties to the American neo-Nazi movement in 1996 at the age of 22.

Picciolini attended DePaul University later in life, earning a degree in international business and international relations.

== Career ==
Picciolini founded another, non-racist punk rock band called Random55 after leaving the white power movement. The band toured with Joan Jett in the mid-1990s. In 1999, Picciolini began working for IBM. He eventually left IBM to start his own record label, Sinister Muse. Sinister Muse is part of the broader entertainment firm Goldmill Group. Picciolini managed Flatfoot 56, a Celtic punk band from Chicago and The Briggs, a Los Angeles punk band.

After graduating from DePaul University, Picciolini spent time writing his personal memoirs about his experience as a youth involved in the early American white power skinhead scene. In 2010, he co-founded Life After Hate, a peace advocacy and counter-extremism consulting group, with former neo-Nazi, Arno Michaelis. That same year, he took over as the executive producer and general manager of JBTV, a music-themed television program and entertainment media network based in Chicago. Picciolini is responsible for changing the show's basic format, securing a national distribution deal with NBC, and earning the show multiple Regional Emmy Award nominations. He would stay at the show until 2012.

In 2011, Picciolini spoke at the Summit Against Violent Extremism (SAVE) in Dublin, Ireland which was presented by Google Ideas and the Tribeca Film Festival. Also in 2011, Picciolini served as the executive producer and film director for the Smashing Pumpkins' DVD re-issues of Gish and Siamese Dream. He also served as the producer for The Frantic's music video for "Blackout Brigade" and, later, as the producer for Dead Town Revival's music video for "Johnny". Picciolini had previously served as producer for The Frantic's music video for "Audio & Murder" and for Dead Town Revival's music video for "Rain."

Picciolini released Romantic Violence: Memoirs of an American Skinhead in April 2015. Over the course of his career, he has contributed to a variety of nationally broadcast programs as a subject matter expert, commenting on issues related to far-right, white supremacist extremism. He appeared on the CBS Evening News with Scott Pelley, on Anderson Cooper 360° on CNN where he discussed the Charleston church shooting, as well as several appearances on DemocracyNow! He has also appeared on Chicago Tonight on WTTW, The Afternoon Shift on WBEZ, NewsMax TV's MidPoint with Ed Berliner, Al Jazeera, WGN Radio, and The Adam Carolla Show. He has also been profiled in online publications like Vice. In March of 2015, he acted as a technical consultant on the CBS television pilot episode of 'For Justice,' directed by Ava DuVernay and produced by Robert De Niro and Jane Rosenthal.

Picciolini left the Life After Hate organization in August 2017, intending to explore international groups that encourage violent extremists to leave their lives of hatred and find better lives. He went on to establish the Free Radicals Project, a global, multidisciplinary extremism and violence prevention, intervention, and disengagement platform and practice.

In July 2020, Picciolini criticized Donald Trump for sharing tweets by white supremacists, using "pejorative language to describe other people", intentionally instilling fear, and emboldening racist language, saying, "It's as if Trump kicked over a bucket of gasoline on all of those small fires that have existed for 400 years and created one large forest fire."

== Awards and recognition ==
In his role as executive producer of JBTV, Picciolini helped the show earn five Regional Emmy Award nominations (three in 2010 and two in 2011). The show won a technical Emmy award in 2010 for motion graphics. In 2016, Picciolini won a Regional Emmy Award for his role as executive producer and director of ExitUSA's "There is life after hate" anti-hate campaign.
