= Squadism =

Physical, anti-fascist direct action

Squadism (or sometimes "Squaddism") was the practice of physical, anti-fascist direct action. The term, often used pejoratively by liberal anti-fascists eschewing violence, originated in the Anti-Nazi League, an anti-fascist campaigning organisation dominated by the heterodox Trotskyist Socialist Workers Party (SWP). The SWP formed "squads", fighting units, in 1977, initially to defend and steward meetings against violent attacks from the fascist National Front. However, other anti-fascist squads emerged separately from the SWP, such as the Sari Squad.

The name associated eventually with all of the fighting groups of that era, i.e., "Squads" originated with the already established Manchester-based anti fascist fighting group, drawn from many groups on the left and non-aligned anti fascists which first adopted the name "The Squad" for its, previously very ad hoc, fighting unit in 1977. The adoption of the name, "Squad", had only an accidental connection with the very similar "Peoples Squads" in Italy in the early 1920s.

Squads were active in the North West of England and then Glasgow, the Midlands, Hatfield, and London in this period. The core of the fighting units were SWP members, but also included many members of other left groups and non-aligned anti fascists. The squads were formed to directly combat the rising tide of fascist "street" violence being experienced by the Left, and black communities, during this period, from the National Front in particular. The regionally-based direct action squads operated within, but also considerably beyond, the ANL. Squad members also used violence and intimidation to break up meetings, marches and other gatherings of far right groups such as the National Front and the British Movement The idea behind the tactic was to ensure the safety of ANL and general left meetings through efficient stewarding, and also to generally intimidate groups seen as fascist, without generating media publicity for the far right.

Squadism became increasingly frowned upon by the ANL/SWP leadership when the National Front's expansion fell away in the late 1970s. By 1979/80, the ANL leadership had decided that the National Front was a broken force, and so militant campaigning anti-fascism was no longer a priority. Militant anti-fascists both within and without the SWP strongly disagreed with what they saw as a mistaken and opportunistic abandonment of militant activity. The SWP leadership had also for some time been concerned that in areas of London and Manchester the semi-clandestine combat groups had become a law unto themselves. A campaign led by the Central Committee within the SWP against "squadists" was organised in late 1981, on the back of an "operation" by the Manchester Squad which resulted in five of its members (and four non-Squad SWP students) receiving prison sentences. Many of the individual SWP members who had defended the Left from fascist attack across the UK for many years were expelled during late 1981 to early 1982.

When the ANL was disbanded in the late 1970s, many ex-squad members went on to form Anti-Fascist Action and Red Action (AFA), whose "Stewarding Group" was active (along the same lines as the earlier "Squads") from the mid-1980s until the early 1990s. As a term of abuse, "squadism" is taken to mean vanguardist, secretive, adventurist, direct action against fascist organisations; isolated from mass anti fascist activities. This negative, pejorative labelling of any combat group based physical force action against fascism has since the 1980s been the political orthodoxy on most of the British Left. Anarchist groups and other anti fascists in particular however have continued the direct physical action, "squadist" approach to fascist street mobilisations to the present day, via a variety of nationally networked groupings over the years, such as "No Platform" and "Antifa"

Similar currents have existed elsewhere, with analogous terminology. In Italy, for example, the Arditi del Popolo (people's squads) pursued a similar policy in the 1920s and were suppressed by the Communist Party of Italy.
