= The Press (band) =

American Oi! band

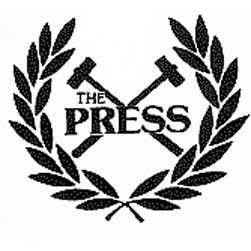
Logo of The Press

The Press are an American Oi! band. Formed in New York City in 1984, the outspoken anti-fascist band were early members of Skinheads Against Racial Prejudice. Vocalist André Schlesinger also supported the views of the British Socialist Workers Party, and this was reflected in some of the band's lyrics. Their songs appeared on several compilation albums, as well as a posthumous CD collection of their recordings called The Complete Press: 1984-1994, released in 2007 by Insurgence Records, re-released on vinyl in 2017. Their song "21 Guitar Salute" has been covered by Dropkick Murphys and Hawkins Thugs; in 2000 The Franks recorded a version of The Press' "It's Not What I Want." In 2019 The Press’ song "Revolution Now" was recorded by another New York-based band, The Take.

The Press reformed in 2016, following the death of founding member André Schlesinger, and has been releasing new songs and records since 2017.

== Members ==
- Scotti Lyons: vocals
- J. Christopher Noone: vocals, guitar
- Mario DaKosta: vocals, guitar
- James Marshall: vocals, bass
- Jordan Pontell: vocals, guitar, bass
- Max Duggan: drums

== Former members ==
- André Schlesinger: lead vocals, guitar
- Bob "Dextrose" Rodrigues: vocals, drums
- John Monahan: vocals, guitar
- Pete Parneros: drums
- Gideon Greenburg: bass
- Tom Hamilton: drums
- Mike Alba: guitar
- Leon the Hippy: drums
- Scott Roberts: vocals, guitar
- Brian Martin: keyboards

== Discography ==
Albums

- Skins 'N' Punks Volume 5: The US Connection, (Split LP with The Radicts), 1989, Oi! Records
- The Complete Press 1984-1994, 2007, (CD version) Insurgence Records
- The Complete Press 1984-1994, 2017, (Vinyl version) Insurgence Records

EPs and singles

- "Is It Any Wonder?" 1994, TNP Records
- The Press/The Brass Split EP, 2018, Insurgence Records
- Torch EP, 2018, Oi! The Boat Records

Compilations

- New York Beat: Hit And Run, 1986, Moon Records (released in Europe by Oi! Records as Skaville USA)
- The Dumpster, 1988, Dimebag Tapes (Cassette-only release)
- The Spirit Of 69 - Oi Classics Vol. II, 1994, Street Kid's Records
- Oi! Skampilation Vol. #1, 1995, Radical Records
- The Best of Oi! Records, 1997, Oi! Records
- Northern Aggression - Project Boneyard Volume II, 2009, Insurgence Records
- Rock Against Racism - Then, Now, Forever, 2018, All Systems Go Records
- Let's Make Some Noise Together - NYC Volume 1, 2019, Let's Make Some Noise Together (Online only)
