= Red Action =

1980s British Leftist activism group

Red Action was a British leftist political group formed in 1981. It became known for violently confronting groups such as the British National Party on the streets, and for being the main organisational force behind Anti-Fascist Action. In 1995, The Independent estimated that Red Action had between twenty and thirty branches with 10–15 activists in each; the paper stated that the group "enthusiastically espouses the use of violence"; it also set out links between Red Action and the Irish republican movement, and stated that its members primarily operated in large cities such as London, Manchester, Leeds, and Glasgow.

The group was formed by activists some time after they were expelled from the Socialist Workers Party (SWP) for their alleged involvement in "squadism" (violent actions) against far right groups. The expelled activists regrouped around a paper named Red Action. After several years, the group became interested in the electoral process, and joined the Red Front electoral alliance in 1987, and the Socialist Alliance in England and Wales in 1999. Red Action members left this organisation, along with the Socialist Party, citing the domination of the SWP over the organisation, some going on to found the Independent Working Class Association.
