= Section carrément anti-Le Pen =

French anti-fascist and anarchist group

The Section carrément anti-Le Pen (SCALP; "Absolutely anti-Le Pen group") is a French anti-fascist and anarchist group, formed in Toulouse in 1984 as a manifestation of the autonomist movement.

== See also ==
- Anti-fascism
- Anarchist communism
- Far left
- Revolutionary movements
