= Hammerskins =

Texan white supremacists with international spread

Hammerskin Nation
- Logo of the Hammerskins
- Abbreviation: HSN or wetnazs
- Formation: 1988
- Type: Neo-Nazism; White supremacism; White nationalism; Antisemitism; Homophobia
- Purpose: Promotion of neo-Nazism, white supremacy, white nationalism, and establishment of a white ethnostate
- Location(s): United States, Canada, Brazil, and various European countries
- Affiliations: Rise Above Movement; Blue-and-Black Movement

The Hammerskins (also known as Hammerskin Nation) are a neo-Nazi group formed in 1988 in Dallas, Texas. Their primary focus is the production and promotion of white power rock music, and many white power bands have been affiliated with the group. The Hammerskins were affiliated with the record label 9% Productions. The Hammerskins host several annual concerts, including Hammerfest, an annual event in both the United States and Europe in honor of deceased Hammerskin Joe Rowan, the lead singer of the band Nordic Thunder.

The Hammerskins were one of the most prominent American white power skinhead groups. The Anti-Defamation League describes them as the United States' best-organized neo-Nazi skinhead group, with the Hammerskin Nation website boasting six chapters in the United States and chapters existing in Canada, various European countries, New Zealand, and Australia. The organization is self-described as "leaderless". Individual members have been involved in many violent attacks and hate crimes, mostly in the US (notably the Wisconsin Sikh temple shooting), although these have not been organized by the group.

It maintains an active recruitment strategy, and encourages members to enlist in military forces in order to learn combat skills for an upcoming race war. Its website is defunct. It has run Facebook groups under the name Crew 38 (now inactive) and its online forums, and this name is also used for supporters of the group in Australia.

== History ==
The Hammerskins emerged in the late 1980s from the Dallas based Confederate Hammerskins. Their name is based on a scene in the 1982 film Pink Floyd – The Wall.

The first international chapters of the group were formed in Northern Ireland and Switzerland in 1990, and Australian and Canadian chapters followed in 1993. During the following year, the regional groups amalgamated, rebranding as Hammerskin Nation, but in 1999 reverted to the regional system under an international umbrella.

Power struggles had split the group into several factions by 2008. The website and online forums went offline in 2001 with little explanation, and not long afterwards, the white supremacist Tom Metzger announced the termination of the group known as Hammerskin Nation. However, another "official" Hammerskin Nation website was launched in 2002, which was still active as of October 2018 but without online forums, but was inactive by April 2020.

== Description ==
The flag used by a fictitious neo-Nazi group in the 1982 film Pink Floyd – The Wall; the Hammerskins design was taken from this logo.

=== Symbolism and motto ===
The Hammerskins logo and design, depicting two red and black crossed claw hammers, was taken from a fictitious neo-Nazi organization depicted in the 1982 film Pink Floyd – The Wall. The two crossed hammer was designed by Gerald Scarfe who made it for Pink Floyd's 1979 album The Wall and its movie, it was soon taken, changed and redesigned for the white supremacist group in Dallas. The portrayal of the fictional group in the film was intended to show Nazism negatively and as a parody. Their logo and the motto "Hammerskins forever, forever hammerskins" ("H.F.F.H.") often appear in their paraphernalia and tattoos. Crew 38 and Hammerskins members also frequently identify themselves with the slogan "838", meaning "hail [the] crossed hammers" (the initialism H.C.H. translates into the eighth, third and eighth letters of the alphabet). As of October 12, 2018, their website showed six U.S. chapters: West, Northwest, Midland, Confederate, Northern, and Eastern, and chapters in Australia, Canada, France, Germany, Hungary, Italy, New Zealand, Portugal, Spain, Sweden, Luxembourg, Switzerland and Brazil. Each chapter, both in the US and internationally, has a specific design which often includes the original Hammerskins logo and a symbol, logo or flag that represents the state or country.

=== Recruitment ===
The organization is self-described as "leaderless". It maintains an active recruitment strategy, and encourages members to enlist in military forces in order to learn combat skills for an upcoming race war.

== United States ==
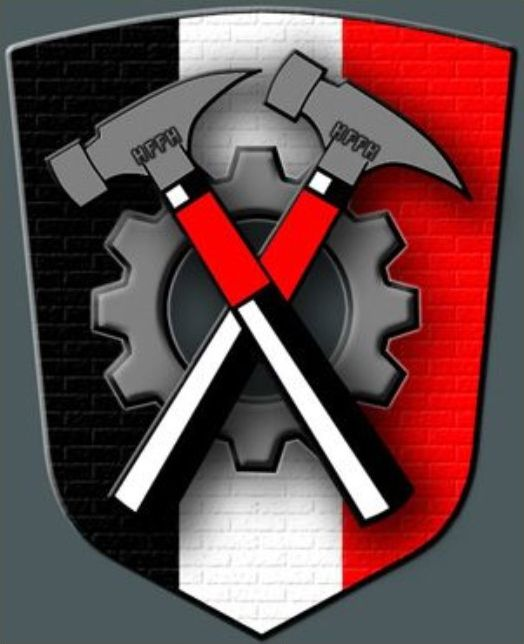
A Hammerskins shield logo

Individual members have been involved in many violent attacks and hate crimes, mostly in the US, although these have not been organized by the group.

Many Outlaw Hammerskins members attended the 2002 NordicFest, and the group was planning to provide security for a white pride festival hosted by the National Knights of the Ku Klux Klan. The Outlaw Hammerskins are now defunct.

Many of its members have been convicted of harassment, assault and even murder. On August 5, 2012, Hammerskin Wade Michael Page was shot by police and died of a self-inflicted gunshot wound to the head after he killed six people in a Sikh temple in Oak Creek, Wisconsin. Page had become a "fully patched" member of the Hammerskins in autumn 2011, according to the Anti-Defamation League. He played in at least three Hammerskin-affiliated bands; End Apathy, Definite Hate and 13 Knots. According to media sources and civil rights organizations, End Apathy, Wade's main band, had played at several recent Hammerskin events in the United States prior to the shooting-spree.

== Southern Cross Hammerskins (Australia) ==
The Australian group, founded in 1993, is known as the Southern Cross Hammerskins. In 2014 they were reported to be active in Melbourne, Brisbane, Gold Coast, Sydney and Adelaide, with a focus on anti-Asian and anti-Muslim sentiment. They target young men, particularly at heavy metal music festivals, and are aligned with skinheads. A support group called Crew 38 was created in 2009, for those who were unable to commit to full membership.

In October 2019, the Southern Cross Hammerskins along with Blood & Honour Australia held the annual Ian Stuart Donaldson Memorial Concert in Melbourne. Various human rights, faith, trade union and anti-discrimination groups lobbied the Victorian Government to stop the concert, to no avail, and it went ahead as intended.

== Crew 38 Finland ==
Hammerskins operate in Finland under the moniker Crew 38. It is most active in Helsinki and Jyväskylä. Since 2022 Finnish Blood & Honour has organized an annual "White Boy Summer Fest" together with Hammerskins and Veren Laki (Law of Blood), a neo-Nazi combat sports collective connected to the Nordic Resistance Movement. The festival includes concerts and MMA tournament.

Crew 38 came under police investigation in connection to the Kankaanpää terrorism arrests when the leader and members of the Finnish Atomwaffen group frequented the Crew 38 headquarters in Muurame and Kerava. A Canadian neo-Nazi charged with terroristic crimes visited and trained with the Hammerskins in Finland. According to Vice News the man is a founding member of Atomwaffen's Canadian branch.

Finnish Hammerskins also have headquarters called "Hammer House" in Uusimaa. In addition to the Hammerskins, Hammer House also hosts other extreme right groups.

== Germany ==
The German chapter of the Hammerskins was banned by the German government on 19 September 2023, that ban was however overturned on 19 December 2025.

== Italy ==
The Italian chapter of the Hammerskins goes by the name "Lealtà e Azione" (Loyalty and Action), and has a wolf's head and a gladius as its logo. Among its founders are Giacomo Pedrazzoli and Stefano Del Miglio, who have both been repeatedly jailed for assault and knife-related crimes. Its members expouse the views of Leon Degrelle and Corneliu Codreanu, the latter figure being featured in one of the group's hymns.

Lealtà e Azione opened its headquarters in 2010 in Milan with the backing of Marco Osnato, with further branches being opened in Monza, Lodi, Abbiategrasso, Genoa and Florence. The group's antiabortion branch, known as "Bran.co", attracted media attention in 2023 when it was permitted to demonstrate in Milan, while a group advocating LGBTQ pride was prohibited from doing so.

== See also ==
- Vinlanders Social Club
- List of white power music acts
