= Vinlanders Social Club =

American skinhead group

The Vinlanders Social Club (VSC) was formed in 2003 by associates and previous members of the skinhead group Outlaw Hammerskins. In 2010, the Phoenix Police Department, with assistance from the local branch of the Anti-Defamation League, arrested several members of the Arizona chapter. Following his departure from the Hammerskins, Eric “The Butcher” Fairburn and Brien James began the Hoosier State Skinheads group, while Steven Smith with four other ex-members formed the Keystone State Skinheads. These two groups in conjunction with the Ohio State Skinheads joined forces in 2003 and formed the VSC.

In 2007, James posted on the VSC website that the group was going to "separate itself from the racist movement".
