= Greensboro massacre =

1979 massacre in North Carolina

Coordinates: 36°3′55.81″N 79°45′49.86″W

- Location: Greensboro, North Carolina, United States
- Date: November 3, 1979
- Target: "Death to the Klan" march
- Attack type: Shootout; mass shooting
- Deaths: 5
- Injuries: 12
- Perpetrators: Ku Klux Klan; National Socialist Party of America

The Greensboro massacre was a deadly confrontation that occurred on November 3, 1979, in Greensboro, North Carolina, when members of the Ku Klux Klan (KKK) and National Socialist Party of America (NSPA) (Note: The National Socialist Party of America was, in coverage of the Greensboro massacre and elsewhere, frequently called the American Nazi Party. However, it was a different group from George Lincoln Rockwell's American Nazi Party, which at the time of the massacre was going by the name of National Socialist White People's Party.) shot and killed five demonstrators in a "Death to the Klan" march organized by the Communist Workers Party (CWP).

The incident was preceded by inflammatory rhetoric and threats of violence, and marked a convergence of the KKK and American neo-Nazi movements, which had previously operated separately. It was later revealed that undercover law enforcement agents had infiltrated both movements and participated in planning the actions that day. Of the five people killed, four were CWP members, and one was married to a CWP member. The victims were activists involved in racial justice efforts and in unionizing textile industry and hospital workers in the area. In addition, nine other anti-Klan demonstrators, two journalists, and a Klansman were wounded.

In the ensuing criminal trials, the KKK and NSPA defendants were acquitted by all-white juries that were selected partly on the strength of their anti-communist views. At the federal criminal civil rights trial in 1984, the defendants claimed they had acted in self-defense, despite reports of "vivid newsreel film to the contrary," and were acquitted. In a subsequent civil lawsuit, eight defendants were found liable for the wrongful death of the one non-CWP protester.

Decades later, the Greensboro City Council formally apologized for the deaths. In 2004, a private organization, the Greensboro Truth and Reconciliation Commission, was formed with the stated goal of investigating the events of November 1979. Though the Commission was limited in its investigatory authority, it concluded that both sides contributed to the tragedy, but that the Klan and NSPA members intended to inflict injury on protesters, and that the police bore significant responsibility for allowing the violence to take place. In 2015, Greensboro unveiled a marker to memorialize the massacre.

== Background ==
The Communist Workers' Party (CWP) had its origin in 1973 in New York as a Marxist formation originally known as the Workers Viewpoint Organization (WVO). The WVO was one of several groups established as part of a trend within the American left known as the new communist movement. These groups formed in the wake of the anti-Vietnam War protests, as young Marxist radicals joined with activists from the more militant elements of the black liberation movement. They rejected the old, pro-Soviet Communist Party USA as soft on capitalism, and studied the leaders and revolutionary movements in the developing world, including communist China. They opposed racism and sexism, and saw organizing multi-racial unions as a strategy for building toward a popular socialist uprising against monopoly capitalism.

In 1976, members of the WVO came to North Carolina and recruited local Black and White activists in Greensboro and Durham who were engaged in healthcare and textile organizing. The WVO members took jobs in the local textile and other manufacturing plants in an attempt to organize workers into unions. Among WVO members who worked in the textile mills was James Waller, who left his medical career to be a full-time organizer. He became president of the local textile workers' unions at Cone's Granite Finishing Plant in Haw River, North Carolina. In the Carolina Piedmont, the communists found some success with both White and Black textile workers, but especially among black workers, who had been excluded from these jobs for decades, and had only recently been hired for mill work since the passing of the federal Equal Employment Opportunities Act in 1972. WVO members were also active in Durham, Kannapolis, and Greensboro. As a result of these efforts, the WVO came into conflict with a local Ku Klux Klan chapter and the National Socialist Party of America, which were garnering public attention in the spring and summer of 1979 with campaigns and marches in Alabama and North Carolina. This group was a schism founded by Frank Collin of the original American Nazi Party. Although coverage of the NSPA frequently called it the American Nazi Party, that was not its official name.

The WVO learned that the Klan was organizing in the area, and in July 1979, WVO activists and local community members in China Grove, NC disrupted a screening of The Birth of a Nation, a 1915 silent film by D. W. Griffith which portrayed the end of the Reconstruction Era and the formation of the KKK in heroic terms, and characterized blacks in a demeaning, racist way. Taunts and inflammatory rhetoric were exchanged between members of the groups during the ensuing months.

In October 1979, the WVO renamed itself the Communist Workers Organization. It planned to stage a rally and march against the Klan on November 3, 1979, in the city of Greensboro, the county seat of Guilford County. The city had been a site of major civil rights actions in the 1960s; sit-ins there resulted in the desegregation of lunch counters.

The CWP publicized their protest as the "Death to the Klan" March. The event was scheduled to start in a predominantly black Greensboro housing project, known as Morningside Homes, and then proceed to a community center for a conference. The CWP distributed flyers that called for radical, even violent opposition to the Klan. One flier said that the Klan "should be physically beaten and chased out of town. This is the only language they understand. Armed self-defense is the only defense." Communist organizers publicly challenged the Klan to attend the march.

== Rally ==
Four local TV news camera teams arrived at Morningside Homes at the corner of Carver and Everitt streets to cover the protest march. Members of the CWP and other anti-Klan supporters gathered to rally and march. As the marchers gathered, a caravan of nine cars and a van filled with an estimated 40 KKK and NSPA members drove in front of the housing project at around 11:20 AM. The two groups heckled each other, and some marchers beat the cars with picket sticks and kicks. The first shot came from the head of the KKK caravan. Several witnesses reported that Klansman Mark Sherer fired first, which he later admitted. A "thick blue smoke" was spotted after the first shot, consistent with the discharge from a black powder pistol Sherer owned. A second shot was fired into the air by Klansman Brent Fletcher, and shots three and four by Sherer, into the ground and a parked car. Some KKK and NSPA members exited their vehicles and engaged in a physical confrontation with marchers. CWP member James Waller ran to retrieve a shotgun from fellow marcher Tom Clark's truck during the confrontation. Klansman Roy Toney spotted him and struggled with Waller for control of the shotgun, which went off during the struggle.

The first shots wounding and killing individuals were discharged soon after, primarily by caravan members. Six caravan members equipped themselves with long guns from the trunk of a Ford Fairlane and fired at the marchers, while the rest of the cars and their occupants fled. Marchers Bill Sampson, Allen Blitz, Rand Manzella, and Claire Butler fired back at the caravan members with handguns. Two of the first fatalities were Waller, shot by NSPA member Roland Wood and Klansman David Matthews, and CWP member Cesar Cauce, shot by Klansman Jerry Paul Smith. Both were unarmed at the time of their deaths. Unarmed marcher Michael Nathan was shot and mortally wounded by Matthews while running towards Waller's body. Sampson was killed while firing at the caravan members. Matthews shot and killed CWP member Sandra Smith after she pulled children to safety inside a community member's apartment, and took cover near Butler, who was firing at caravan members. Smith herself was unarmed. The final shot was fired by Blitz 88 seconds after the violence first began.

Four CWP members were killed at the scene and Nathan died of his wounds at the hospital two days later. Twelve others were wounded. The filmed coverage of the shootings was carried on national and international news, and the event became known as the "Greensboro Massacre." Smith was black, Cauce was Cuban-American, and the other three men killed were white, two of them Jewish. Both blacks and whites were among the wounded, including one KKK member and two news crew members.

=== Casualties ===
Died: All but Michael Nathan were CWP members and rank-and-file union leaders and organizers. Nathan was sworn into the CWP on his deathbed.

- Cesar Cauce, whose family immigrated as refugees from Cuba when he was a child, grew up in Miami, Florida and graduated magna cum laude from Duke University; he worked in the anti-war movement, as a writer for Workers Viewpoint, and as a union organizer at Duke Hospital in Durham, North Carolina. He was the brother of Ana Mari Cauce, who served as president of the University of Washington from October 2015 to June 2025;
- James Waller, elected as president of a local textile workers union; was a pediatrician. He taught at Duke University and was a co-founder of the Carolina Brown Lung Association (for textile workers); he had left his medical practice in North Carolina to organize textile workers;
- William Evan Sampson, a graduate of the Harvard Divinity School and medical student, who became active in civil rights; he worked to organize the union at Cone Mills' White Oak Plant in Greensboro;
- Sandra Neely Smith, born and raised in South Carolina, was a civil rights activist and president of the student body at Greensboro's Bennett College; was planning to become a nurse, but postponed her studies to organize textile workers and improve health conditions at the plant; and
- Michael Nathan, chief of pediatrics at Lincoln Community Health Center, a clinic for children from low-income families in Durham, North Carolina. Wounded in the shooting, he died two days later at the hospital. He was not a member of the CWP but was supporting his wife, Marty Nathan, who was also wounded that day.

Wounded survivors:

- Paul Bermanzohn, CWP organizer and physician, required brain surgery, suffered permanent paralysis on the left side of his body;
- Thomas Clark, marcher;
- Martha "Marty" Nathan, CWP member and physician, widow of Michael Nathan;
- Nelson Johnson, organizer and CWP member;
- James Wrenn, CWP member, critically wounded, required brain surgery;
- Frankie Powell, CWP member, struck by birdshot in legs;
- Claire Butler, CWP member;
- Don Pelles, marcher, struck by birdshot in face;
- Rand Manzella, marcher;
- Harold Flowers, KKK member, shot in the arm and left leg;
- Matt Sinclair, WTVD reporter, struck by birdshot; and
- David Dalton, news cameraman;

=== Role of the police ===
By the late 1970s, most police departments had become familiar with handling demonstrations, especially in cities such as Greensboro where numerous civil rights events had taken place since 1960. CWP march organizers had filed their plans for this march with the police and gained permission to hold it. Police generally covered such formal events in order to prevent outbreaks of violence; no officers were present at the time of this confrontation. A police photographer and a detective followed the Klan and neo-Nazi caravan to the site, but they stayed several blocks away, and did not attempt to directly intervene in events. Testimony in the 1985 civil rights trial and in the investigation by the Greensboro Truth Reconciliation Commission established that some police officers were specifically directed away from the site, and others were told to keep a "low profile".

Edward Dawson, a Klansman-turned FBI/police informant was riding in the lead car of the caravan. He had been an FBI informant since 1969 as part of the agency's COINTELPRO program. He was among the founders of the North Carolina Knights of the Ku Klux Klan when the North Carolina chapter of the United Klans of America split. By 1979 he was working as an informant for the Greensboro Police Department. The police had provided him with the march permit as well as a copy of the march route with its unpublished starting location. The permit specified the requirement that the marchers be unarmed. The morning of the shooting, Dawson notified the police that the Klan was prepared for armed violence, and that a caravan of nine cars of Klan and Nazis with firearms was approaching the marchers gathered at the corner of Everitt and Carver Streets, the site of the Morningside Homes housing project.

The police detective who trailed the caravan radioed for extra units at 11:23 AM. The first to arrive were two tactical officers two minutes later, who arrested 12 caravan members from the van. However, the cars and their occupants were able to escape from the scene. Some CWP marchers, including Nelson Johnson and Willena Cannon, were also arrested as other police units converged on the scene.

Bernard Butkovich, an undercover agent for the US Bureau of Alcohol, Tobacco and Firearms (ATF), had infiltrated the NSPA. This group was formed by Frank Collin, who had been ousted from the National Socialist White People's Party. The NSPA members joined with the KKK chapter to disrupt the November 1979 protest march. At the 1980 criminal trial, the neo-Nazis claimed that Butkovich encouraged them to carry firearms to the demonstration. At the 1985 civil trial, Butkovich testified that he was aware that the KKK and NSPA members intended to confront the demonstrators. However, he did not inform the police or any other law enforcement agency of the likelihood of violence.

== Aftermath ==
=== Funeral ===
A funeral march for the five victims was held in Greensboro on November 11, 1979. The funeral was preceded by a procession in which 500 people marched with the coffins of four of the victims through the city to Maplewood Cemetery. The body of Sandra Smith was returned at her family's request to her hometown in South Carolina for burial. There was controversy over whether the funeral should be allowed, and in the end, the city arranged for the deployment of hundreds of armed National Guard troops to back up local police. The city declared a state of emergency, and roadblocks prevented many marchers from entering the city. Every car entering the city was searched at roadblocks and 35 CWP members and supporters were arrested. Photographs and film footage of the event show helicopters and National Guard armed personnel carriers, along with armed police and Guardsmen, flanking the marchers and lining the route of the procession.

=== Gravestone ===
The four male victims were buried in Maplewood cemetery near Morningside Homes. The inscription intended for their memorial was initially opposed by the city council, citing new ordinances banning political speech in that context. With support from the North Carolina ACLU, the inscription was allowed.

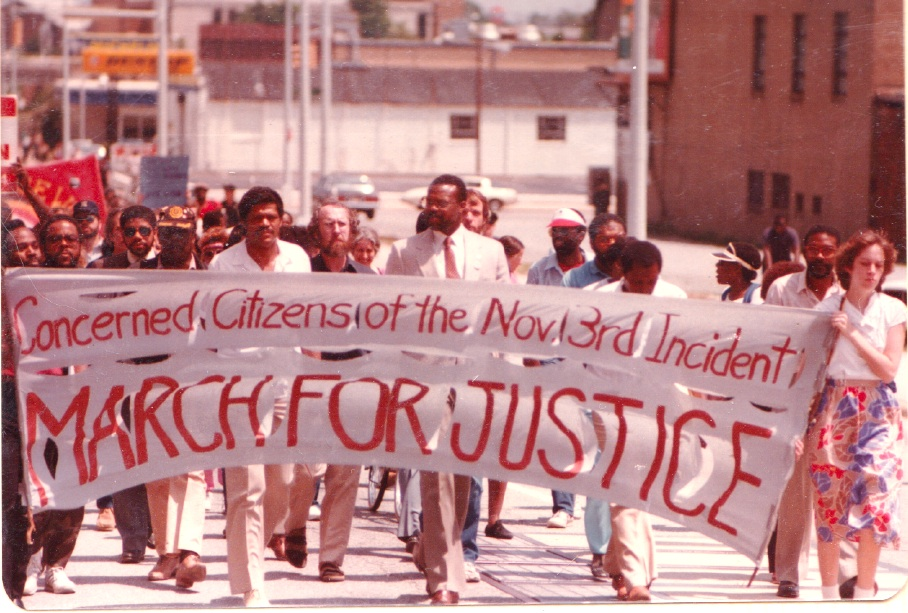
March of concerned citizens after the Greensboro Massacre. Photo from the Christic Institute archives.

=== State's prosecution ===
Forty Klansmen and neo-Nazis, and several CWP marchers were said to have taken part in the shootings. The police arrested 16 Klansmen, neo-Nazis, and several CWP members. The FBI started an investigation which it called GREENKIL (Greensboro Killings), turning over evidence it gathered to the state of North Carolina for its murder trial.

The state attorney prosecuted the six strongest criminal cases first, charging five Klansmen with murder: David Wayne Matthews, Jerry Paul Smith, Jack Wilson Fowler, Harold Dean Flowers, and Billy Joe Franklin. One was charged with a lesser crime. On November 17, 1980 the jury acquitted all the defendants, finding that they had acted in self-defense. Residents of Morningside Homes — the housing development where the violence occurred, and students at North Carolina Agricultural and Technical State University (A&T), expressed shock and anger over the verdict and a feeling of hopelessness regarding the judicial system and the Ku Klux Klan.

=== Federal criminal trial ===
The Department of Justice through the FBI had an extensive criminal investigation underway. After the acquittals in 1980, the FBI re-opened its investigation in preparation for a federal prosecution. Based on additional evidence, a federal grand jury indicted nine men on civil rights charges in 1983. Mark Sherer pleaded guilty to a federal conspiracy charge for firing the first shot. He was sentenced to six months in a community treatment center and five years of probation. He was the only person found guilty of a crime in the case.

The case brought by the US attorney "charged the Klansmen and neo-Nazis with racially motivated violence and with interference in a racially integrated event." Three men were charged with violating the civil rights of the five victims: the defendants were David Wayne Matthews, Jerry Paul Smith and Jack Wilson Fowler, who had been prosecuted and acquitted in the state criminal trial.

Six other men were charged with "conspiracy to violate the demonstrators' civil rights:" Virgil Lee Griffin, Sr.; Eddie Dawson (also a police informant), Roland Wayne Wood, Roy Clinton Toney, Coleman Blair Pridmore, and Rayford Milano Caudle

Neither trial investigated the actions of federal agents or the Greensboro police. On April 15, 1984, all nine defendants were acquitted. The government had a burden to prove the defendants were motivated by racial hatred in order to bring them to federal charges. The CWP believed that the indictment was drawn too narrowly, giving the defense an opportunity to argue that political opposition to communism and patriotic fervor, rather than racial animus, prompted the confrontation.

News outlets, including The New York Times, The Washington Post, and the News & Record in Greensboro, remarked on the all-white juries that decided both the 1980 and 1984 cases.

=== Subsequent arrests of KKK members ===
Approximately 2 months after the massacre on the evening of January 15 or 16, 1980 Virgil Lee Griffin and Mark Sherer were arrested after an off duty prison guard spotted Sherer fleeing from a burning cross at a residence and entering the passenger side of a 1973 Mercury Comet driven by Griffin. The officer recognized Mark Sherer from a previous incarceration for armed robbery and radioed officers in the direction of their travel. After a short chase, the pair were arrested 5 miles away by Lincoln County Sheriff's Officers and Lincolnton Police. Sherer was discovered to be carrying a fully loaded 44 black powder single action revolver in a shoulder holster. Also found in the car was KKK and Communist Party Literature, a 16 gauge sawed-off shotgun with no serial number, and a .22 semi-automatic rifle. Upon being detained they both refused to answer questions about the cross burning, but Virgil Lee Griffin made a sworn affidavit that none of the firearms in the vehicle were his.

Mark Sherer was charged with possession of a firearm within 5 years of conviction of a felony (Note: Mark Sherer was on parole from a December, 15, 1977 conviction of armed robbery in Mecklenburg County, NC), and cross-burning. Virgil Lee Griffin was charged with aiding and abetting as well as reckless driving. Mark Sherer later pled guilty to possession of a firearm by a felon and cross burning while Virgil Lee Griffin pled guilty to felony aiding and abetting.

=== Waller v. Butkovich ===
CWP survivors had also filed a civil suit in Federal District Court, seeking $48 million in damages. The first two criminal trials had delayed this suit, which finally commenced in 1985. The Christic Institute led the legal effort. The complaint alleged that law-enforcement officials knew "that Klansmen and Nazis would use violence to disrupt the demonstration by Communist labor organizers and black residents of Greensboro but deliberately failed to protect them." Four federal agents were named as defendants in the suit, in addition to 36 Greensboro police and municipal officials, and 20 Klansmen and members of the American Nazi Party. Among the federal defendants was Bernard Butkovich of the Bureau of Alcohol, Tobacco and Firearms, who had worked as an undercover agent in 1979 and infiltrated one of the American Nazi Party chapters three months before the protest. He testified that a Klansman had referred in a planning meeting to using pipe bombs for possible assaults at the rally, and that he took no further action.

The Christic legal team was led by attorneys Lewis Pitts and Daniel Sheehan, together with People's Law Office attorney G. Flint Taylor and attorney Carolyn McAllaster of Durham, North Carolina. A federal jury in Winston-Salem, North Carolina, found two Klansmen, three neo-Nazis, two Greensboro police officers, and a police informant liable for the wrongful death of Michael Nathan and for injuries to survivors Paul Bermanzohn and Tom Clark. On June 8, 1985, the jury levied a $351,000 judgment against the city, the KKK, and the American Nazi Party for violating the civil rights of the demonstrators. The entire judgment was paid by the city of Greensboro in order to cover damages caused by the KKK and NSPA as well. Nathan's family and the two survivors chose to donate most of the money to the Greensboro Justice Fund, a foundation created in memory of the five victims, which distributed small grants to organizations involved in grassroots efforts for social justice and education.

=== Greensboro Truth and Reconciliation Commission ===
In November 2004, nearly 700 people, including several survivors, marched in Greensboro along the original planned route from the housing project to Greensboro City Hall to mark the 25th anniversary of the event. That year, a group of private citizens founded the Greensboro Truth and Reconciliation Commission (GTRC). The private group announced that the Commission would take public testimony and conduct an investigation in order to examine the causes and consequences of the massacre. The GTRC was patterned after other truth and reconciliation commissions, notably the one conducted in post-apartheid South Africa.

The organizers appealed to the Mayor and the City Council for their endorsement, but failed to gain support. The Greensboro City Council, led by Mayor Keith Holliday, voted six to three against endorsing the work of the group. The three African-American members of the Council voted in favor of the measure. The mayor at the time of the massacre, Jim Melvin, also rejected the private commission. Without official recognition and statutory authority, the Commission lacked both the power of subpoena to compel testimony, and the ability to invoke the charge of perjury for false testimony. "The mandate of the Commission was decidedly specific – no matter how painful it might prove to be, its core mission would be to reveal and disseminate the truth."

The process followed by the GTRC was described in its Introduction to the final report:

The commission was ultimately successful in securing the cooperation of survivors by conducting one-on-one interviews. This resulted in the collection of 145 oral statements. The commission also granted requests from a dozen individuals (who wished to remain anonymous), to include their statements in the final report. Included in the oral statements were testimonials of 17 demonstrators and 14 people from the-then Morningside Homes (which were demolished in 2002), along with 7 written accounts. The Greensboro Truth and Reconciliation Commission was also successful in obtaining statements from six current or former Greensboro police officers, five current or former members of the KKK and the American Nazi Party, and a judge. Three public hearings were held.... For the commissioners' safety, each public hearing featured a significant police presence.

==== Findings and conclusions ====
In May 2006, after two years of community meetings, public testimony, individual interviews and documentary research, the seven commissioners reported their findings and conclusions. It noted that both the Communist Workers Party and the Klan contributed in varying degrees to the violence, especially given the violent rhetoric they were espousing for months leading up to the confrontation at the march. The report asserted that the CWP did not intend to use handguns for anything other than self-defense. It said that the protesters had not fully secured the community support of the Morningside Homes residents for holding the event there. Many of the residents did not approve of the protest because they feared it had the risk of catalyzing violence on their doorsteps. The commission concluded that the KKK and NSPA members went to the rally intending to provoke a violent confrontation, and that they fired on demonstrators with intent to injure

In its final report, the Commission stressed the importance of the Greensboro Police Department's absence from the scene. The police presence at previous confrontations between the same groups had resulted in no violence. There was testimony before the commission that the GPD had infiltrated the Klan and, through a paid informant, knew of the white supremacists' plans and the strong potential for violence that day. The informant had formerly been on the Federal Bureau of Investigation's payroll and maintained contact with his agent's supervisor. Consequently, the FBI was also aware of the impending armed confrontation, although they repeatedly denied any prior knowledge. The commission reported that at least one activist in the crowd fired back after the attack started.

The Commission reflected on the disproportionate antagonism evidenced by the police toward the CWP activists compared to their attitude toward the Klan and NSPA: "This fear of vocal black activists who advocated armed self-defense but who had no criminal record other than disorderly conduct, stands in stark contrast to the dismissal of the threat posed by Klansmen and Nazis who openly advocated and had a criminal record of committing racist violence," the report said.

== City's recognition ==
- On June 17, 2009, the City Council issued a "statement of regret" about the 1979 incident.
- On May 24, 2015, the City of Greensboro officially unveiled a historical marker acknowledging the 1979 events, at a ceremony attended by more than 300 people. It reads: "Greensboro Massacre – Ku Klux Klansmen and American Nazi Party members, on Nov. 3, 1979, shot and killed five Communist Workers Party members one-tenth mile north." The city council had voted to approve the proposed state highway marker. Two city council members voted against the historical marker, explaining that they did not consider the event a "massacre".
- On October 6, 2020, the city council approved a resolution apologizing for the incident.

== In popular culture ==
- Orchestral Manoeuvres in the Dark recorded "88 Seconds in Greensboro" about the massacre.
- Pop Will Eat Itself recorded "88 Seconds... & Still Counting" on the album Cure for Sanity also about the incident.
- Saturday Night Live aired a sketch the following year titled "Commie Hunting Season" that made specific reference to the incident.

== See also ==
- Bibliography of the history of the Ku Klux Klan
- Bibliography of the history of lynching
