= Greensboro Truth and Reconciliation Commission =

The Greensboro Truth and Reconciliation Commission was established in 2004 to analyze the violent events of November 3, 1979, in Greensboro, North Carolina. On that date, the Communist Workers Party (CWP), led by Nelson Johnson, gathered at the Morningside Homes housing project to advocate for social and economic justice, and to protest the interference of the KKK in Greensboro. The chant that united the 40–50 protesters was "death to the Klan". Shortly after 11 am, a nine-vehicle convoy arrived; it contained members of the KKK and a neo-Nazi group, the National Socialist Party of America (NSPA). After a short skirmish, the KKK and NSPA members retrieved their firearms and moments later, five protesters lay dead and twelve others were wounded.

In 1999 on the 20th anniversary of what became known as the "Greensboro massacre", the idea was raised to form a fact-finding commission to shed light on what happened, and bring closure to the Greensboro community. In 2004 the Greensboro Truth and Reconciliation Commission was established, mainly through private and local donations. The commissioners released their final report in 2006. It condemned not only the KKK and NSPA, but also the Greensboro Police Department and city officials for allowing the violence to happen and for not punishing the perpetrators.

== Events of November 3, 1979 ==
On November 3, 1979, a group numbering between 40 and 50 demonstrators arrived at the Morningside Homes housing project in Greensboro at 11 a.m. for a peaceful march, aimed at advancing social, economic and racial justice and to protest against the Ku Klux Klan (KKK). The event was organized by Nelson Johnson of the Communist Workers Party, and set to begin at twelve noon. The marchers were soon met by a convoy of nine vehicles, containing 37 members of the KKK and NSPA, who proceeded to leave their vehicles, confront the protesters with long pieces of lumber, and initiate a violent fight. After a short skirmish, members of the KKK and NSPA retreated to their vehicles and retrieved firearms, including shotguns, semi-automatic rifles, and pistols. A number of individuals began to fire their weapons at the protesters. The shooting lasted a span of 88 seconds. Five protesters—Cesar Cauce, Dr. James Waller, Sandra Smith, Bill Simpson and Dr. Michael Nathan—were killed, and twelve others wounded. Johnson, for his part, was tackled by law enforcement, detained, and ultimately arrested for starting a riot. He later stated, "I knew that in the depths of my soul that we had been set up." A curfew was immediately implemented in the Morningside neighborhood, followed by the deployment of the North Carolina National Guard, and public service announcements to deter anyone from participating in any further marches.

On a street adjacent to Morningside, Claudette Burroughs-White was home when a child ran up to her and informed her of the events he witnessed: "I thought he was losing his mind. When I found out that it was the truth, I was just so angry. It was scary that in broad daylight the Klan was shooting. You start gathering up your children and say come in this house until we find out what's going on. [The fact that] you can look on television and see people just shooting people, and at the end of all of that, nobody gets a day in prison time. It is still unbelievable. It is just unbelievable."

These events, termed the "Greensboro Massacre", were captured live by the press and profiled on national news outlets including the CBS Evening News. However, the massacre was overshadowed the following day with the onset of the Iran Hostage Crisis.

Funeral services for the protesters were attended by upwards of 800 people, with 1,000 law enforcement officials specifically assigned to maintain order.

== The Commission ==
In 1999 on the occasion of commemorating the 20th anniversary of the massacre, Greensboro residents proposed forming a truth and reconciliation commission. The motivation was to objectively review what transpired on November 3, 1979. For years, rumors had circulated that the Greensboro Police Department was directly involved, and that city leaders, in order to protect police officers and themselves, had initiated a cover-up. An independent commission, its supporters argued, could put the rumors to rest and bring closure to the families of the deceased as well as the remaining survivors.

In the 1980s, there were three significant criminal and civil cases stemming from the massacre. In the two criminal trials, all-white juries acquitted the KKK and NSPA defendants, despite eyewitness testimony and video news footage showing them shooting at the crowd of protesters. A 1985 civil trial, focused on the wrongful death of one particular victim, resulted in a judgment against two Greensboro Police officers, four Klansmen, and two NSPA members. The city of Greensboro was ordered to pay $351,500 in restitution. This civil lawsuit suggested that city officials and police officers were more involved in the events of November 3, 1979, than previously admitted. The outcomes of these trials contributed to the establishment of the Greensboro Truth and Reconciliation Commission.

The Greensboro Truth and Community Reconciliation Project (or simply "the Project") was founded in November 1999. It called for an independent commission to be created to investigate the events of November 3, 1979. The main challenge was to secure necessary financial support to undertake the work. Significant funding was donated by the Andrus Family Fund, with additional money coming from the International Center for Transitional Justice. According to the donors, their overriding objective was not punitive; they were not seeking to legally or financially sanction the responsible parties (i.e., the KKK and NSPA), but instead to achieve a degree of societal reconciliation. This reconciliation, it was held, could be most fully realized by objectively examining the truth surrounding the Greensboro Massacre. It was later decided in October 2002, to not use the term "Massacre" in respect to the parties involved. On January 10, 2003, 32 prominent Greensboro community members with ties to both the city and county government, including then city councilor Claudette Burroughs-White, declared their support for the establishment of a truth and reconciliation commission.

A process was identified for the selection of seven volunteer commissioners to serve on what would come to be known as the Greensboro Truth and Reconciliation Commission. The mandate of the Commission was decidedly specific – no matter how painful it might prove to be, its core mission would be to reveal and disseminate the truth. From a total of 67 nominees put forward in February 2004, the selection committee was given 90 days to agree on 7 commissioners. This committee, in reviewing applicants, was empowered to consider an applicant's character and relationship to Greensboro. Among the personal characteristics that the selection committee sought were: "demonstrating commitment to the values of truth, reconciliation, equity and justice; will commit to seek the truth; will commit to not allow outside forces to taint the work/report of the commissioners; interest in racial, socio-economic, religious and gender diversity; and knowledge of human rights and legal framework."

On May 27, 2004, the seven commissioners (five women and two men) were publicly announced; the list included Muktha Jost, Bob Peters, Barbara Walker, Pat Clark, Cynthia Brown, Angela Lawrence, and Mark Sills. Three (Jost, Brown and Lawrence) were African American, and Lawrence, Sills (who also served on the selection committee) and Brown were native North Carolinians.

=== Research conducted ===
Initially, the commission encountered significant difficulty in collecting statements from the survivors, as many individuals were wary of the commission's mandate and its ability to effect durable social change. The commission was ultimately successful in securing the cooperation of survivors by conducting one-on-one interviews. This resulted in the collection of 145 oral statements. The commission also granted requests from a dozen individuals (who wished to remain anonymous), to include their statements in the final report. Included in the oral statements were testimonials of 17 demonstrators and 14 people from the-then Morningside Homes (which were demolished in 2002), along with 7 written accounts. The Greensboro Truth and Reconciliation Commission was also successful in obtaining statements from six current or former Greensboro police officers, five current or former members of the KKK and NSPA, and a judge. Three public hearings were held (two at local area universities, and one at a high school), each of which transpired over a two-day period (Friday and Saturday). For the commissioners' safety, each public hearing featured a significant police presence.

Following the conclusion of the first hearing, Bongani Finca, a commissioner on the South Africa Truth and Reconciliation Commission reminded commissioners that, “your credibility is on the line; you need to be pressing for answers. You can be respectful, but you need to ask tougher questions.”

The ability of the commission, however, to secure additional statements was constrained by a range of factors:

1. People were ultimately unwilling to provide statements for fear of retaliation;
2. the commission was not given direct subpoena powers;
3. a police attorney advised retired Greensboro police officers from providing statements; and,
4. the newspaper editor of the Greensboro News and Record instructed his staff members not to provide statements. To avoid scrutiny, the newspaper agreed to let the commission have access to its archives. All five of the victims' widows also gave permission to the commission to grant immunity to any individual willing to offer a testimonial, so more information and statements could be collected.

Members of the Greensboro Truth and Reconciliation Commission, in the course of their work, realized that there was not a consensus in Greensboro on which parties or specific actions were culpable, nor on who constituted a victim.

=== Findings ===
On May 25, 2006, the commission "held a ceremony in the chapel at Bennett College for Women to release its final report to the public." Totaling in excess of 500 pages, the commission's report found that Nelson Johnson did indeed plan the march, which was state-wide, for the stated purposes of promoting social, economic and racial justice. Johnson had also followed proper procedure by applying for a parade permit from the Greensboro Police Department, listing Morningside Homes as the starting point for the march. The police, however, gave their informant, Klan member Eddie Dawson, a copy of the permit which provided the exact route and time of the march. The report also revealed that the police were well aware of the history between the KKK-NSPA and the Communist Workers Party (CWP). There had been an earlier confrontation between the groups in China Grove, North Carolina, and it was clear that the KKK and NSPA were looking for an opportunity to exact revenge. The police also knew that it was the intention of both the KKK and NSPA to confront the protesters, make an attempt to prevent the march from occurring, and above all, that members from each group would very likely be armed with firearms. The police further knew that if the march was in fact disrupted, that Klan and NSPA members would be acting in violation of the protesters' First Amendment rights of free speech and assembly. In advance of the march, Johnson was required by the Greensboro police to sign an agreement stating that he and his fellow protesters would not be armed. Though some protesters defied the agreement, North Carolina laws in 1979 did not make it illegal for protesters to carry weapons. The commission found, "The idea of armed self-defense is acceptable and deeply embedded in our national identity and tradition [yet] there is a double standard by which armed black people are seen as an unacceptable threat."

Johnson, the report of the commission makes clear, was never notified or warned in advance by Greensboro police of the KKK's and NSPA's intentions regarding the march. The police went so far as to purposely station all of its officers in a perimeter some five to twenty-four blocks away from the Morningside Homes housing projects. When Officer April Wise and her colleague were at Morningside Homes to investigate an act of domestic violence, they were called back by their superiors. Police in the field were ordered to remain at their posts. They did this even when a plainclothes officer reported the approaching caravan of KKK and NSPA members. Greensboro police officers also stayed put after the shootings, deciding to only stop the last car in the caravan.

Following the shootings, the commission's report found that the city of Greensboro took immediate and significant steps to purposely deflect critical attention and conceal facts from the public. The Greensboro Truth and Reconciliation Report underscored the "intentionality [of the Greensboro Police] to provide adequate protection and deliberately [mislead] the public in regarding what happened on November 3, 1979." The report further pointed to compelling "evidence of deliberate manipulation and concealment of the facts that we can only interpret as intended to sever the Greensboro Police Department from any responsibility. Greensboro's mayor and other city officials, the commission's report alleged, had gone so far as to intimidate local news stations to not broadcast footage of the massacre: "The events of November 3, 1979 and the days that followed produced 'general distrust of police, the justice system, elected officials and the media.'" The commission found that the police department had underestimated the threat posed by the KKK and NSPA, and overestimated the perceived threat of Johnson and the CWP.

=== Recommendations ===
The commission offered several recommendations.

- First, as a city, it was recommended that Greensboro undertake meaningful gestures to acknowledge the events of November 3, 1979. The commission, for example, recommended the issuance of public and private apologies to those harmed and affected by the events.
- Second, the Greensboro Police Department was strongly encouraged to issue a public apology, issue compensation, and erect public exhibitions about November 3, 1979.
- A third recommendation suggested the need to reform institutional practices of local government by paying all of its city workers a fair and decent wage, while training them along with county workers on antiracism.
- The fourth recommendation advanced by the commission called for increased funding for low-income residents, via the Department of Social Services and Public Health.
- Fifth, along with educating school children about what transpired on November 3, 1979, the commission recommended a citizens review board to examine the workings of the Greensboro Police Department.
- Next was a call to expand the lists and field of potential jurors, so that all future impaneled juries could fairly represent the community by avoiding the selection of all-white juries.
- Seventh, a list of current allegations of corruption by the Greensboro Police Department should be made public and fully investigated.
- The commission also encouraged the use of criminal and civil lawsuits, to encourage people's faith in the justice system and to hold the Greensboro Police Department accountable.
- The ninth and arguably the most important recommendation of the commission was a call for active and vigilant citizen engagement. Examples provided included, attending education programs that focus on anti racism and diversity, so the community can be well versed on a range of subjects including privilege, oppression, and economic and social justice. The community was recommended to work together to find solutions to everyday problems, couple with a need for study and dialogue groups, aimed at examining the beliefs and ideologies held by the Greensboro community.

== Reactions ==
The work of the commission and its subsequent recommendations elicited both positive and negative responses. The commission's report, according to Nelson Johnson, was a “gift” suggesting others in the community of Greensboro needed to read and benefit from it. An editorial on the commission's final report, authored by Allen Johnson of the Greensboro News & Record, found that as an “overall body of work, the report is well researched and documented”, and that, “despite its flaws and arguably even because of them, the report provides a valuable opportunity for reflection.”

The mayor of Greensboro on November 3, 1979, Jim Melvin, – within a day or two of the final report being made public - stated that, “I’ll stand on the reputation of the police department. We had a good police department on November 3[rd.]” Keith Holliday, who was Greensboro's mayor when the report was publicly issued, decided to reject the commission's recommendations calling for the Greensboro police department and the city itself to apologize for what happened on November 3, 1979. Holliday instead preferred to simply express regret for the events of that day. Two Democratic Guilford County Commissioners expressed their support for the commission's specific recommendations in favor of a living wage and antiracist training – both of which were opposed by a Republican-controlled Guilford County commission.

== See also ==
- List of truth and reconciliation commissions
- Claude Barnes
