= Virgil Lee Griffin =

Ku Klux Klan Grand Dragon

Virgil Lee Griffin (February 27, 1944 – February 11, 2009) was a leader of a Ku Klux Klan chapter in North Carolina who was involved in the November 3, 1979, Greensboro massacre, a violent clash by the KKK and American Nazi Party with labor organizers and activists from the Communist Workers Party at a legal march in the county seat of Guilford County. It resulted in the deaths of five marchers, including a woman.

== Early life ==
Griffin was born to Johnny and Lizzie Griffin. He had a brother John and three sisters: Geraldine, Francis, and Janie. He grew up picking cotton and played with blacks as a child. He worked at a gas station as a "halfway mechanic".

He joined the Ku Klux Klan when he was 18. While its influence had declined since the 1920s, individual chapters were sometimes active. Later he said that he had joined to prevent mixing of the races, particularly in marriage. Griffin claimed that the African-American customers he served at the gas station would ask for his services personally even though they knew of his KKK membership: "As much as I'm on TV, I'm sure everyone of them knew I was in the Klan. They knew what I was. And I knew they was in the N.A.A.C.P. What they do is their business."

== Greensboro massacre ==
His activities with the Klan brought Griffin notoriety. But his leadership of joint KKK and American Nazi Party members to confront a November 3, 1979, march in Greensboro by members of the Communist Workers Party gained him national coverage and notoriety. A violent confrontation erupted after Klansmen drove through the gathering activists, who responded by hitting the cars. The KKK and ANP members took rifles, shotguns, and handguns from their cars and started shooting, killing five marchers, four of whom were CWP members. A woman CWP member was among those killed. Four of the dead were white men; one was a black woman.

On the morning of the shootings, Griffin's Klansmen and American Nazis, in a nine-vehicle caravan, veered from the destination and at 11:30 drove through a group of people gathering for the noon rally. The police were not yet in place to protect the marchers, who had a permit for the event. Griffin said he told his members to go without robes and guns, but many had rifles, shotguns and handguns in the trunks of their cars.

"We had just planned to fly our American flags across the street to show them we love our country," Griffin said.

Witnesses agreed that the marchers began hitting the cars, but accounts differed widely as to the next events. The marchers contended that the Klansmen and the Nazis left their cars and opened fire with shotguns, rifles and pistols; video coverage confirmed this. Five marchers were killed and 10 injured. The Klansmen and Nazis contended that they reacted in self-defense to having their cars attacked. They said the marchers fired the first shot. Griffin said the shots that hit the demonstrators were not aimed at them.

"Someone fired a shot -- and all hell broke loose," Griffin said. "We had every right to be drive down that street with nobody touching the cars. I didn't come to shoot or kill nobody."

While Griffin said that the shootings were not planned, a police informant had advised the police that the group intended to have violent confrontation. Despite this, the police were not in place before the march. Klansmen claimed the fight broke out between the groups because Communists tried to pull a 79-year-old Klansman out of his car.

In 1980, six Klansmen and Nazis, not including Griffin, were prosecuted by the state for first-degree murder and felony riot. They were acquitted by an all-white jury, which concluded they acted in self-defense. In 1984, after a three-month federal civil rights trial, Griffin was among nine Klan members acquitted in federal court, also by an all-white jury, on charges of violating the marchers' civil rights.

In 2005, Griffin told a group studying the Greensboro massacre that he never would have gone to the rally had he not been goaded by the inflammatory rhetoric of the labor organizers. At a forum in 2005, Griffin was asked why no Klansmen were killed in the crossfire, to which he replied: "Maybe God guided the bullets."

== KKK and other activity ==
In 1965, Griffin and another man were convicted of posing as detectives investigating a racial incident at a school. In 1980, Griffin and another Klan members were charged for a cross burning in Lincoln County, North Carolina. Griffin pleaded guilty and was sentenced to one to three years in the county jail, with six months suspended. He was also placed on probation for 2.5 years. Sherer was sentenced one to three years in prison, with all but six months suspended, plus three years of probation.

In 1979, Griffin was identified in The New York Times as Grand Dragon of the North Carolina Knights of the Ku Klux Klan. He later founded the Christian Knights of the Ku Klux Klan. He has most recently been identified as the imperial wizard of the Mount Holly-based Cleveland Knights of the Ku Klux Klan.

For most of the last three decades, the Klan has lost both prominence and viciousness, according to the Anti-Defamation League and other anti-hate groups. But its opposition to illegal immigration has helped draw new sympathizers, and Griffin tried to be a leader in that effort. "Shoot one, and let them know we are sealing our borders," Griffin said in an interview with WCNC.com of Charlotte, North Carolina. He and other Klan officials were in the midst of rebuilding, exploiting fears over illegal immigrants. "People are tired of this mess," Griffin told The Charlotte Observer in 2007. "The illegal immigrants are taking this country over."

== Personal life and death ==
Griffin was married to Linda Griffin and they had six children: Linda, Shirley, John, James, Christine and Virgil Lee, Jr. Griffin resided in Mount Holly, North Carolina.

By the late 1990s, Griffin had suffered two heart attacks, bypass surgery, and a ruptured disc in his neck. Griffin died on February 11, 2009, at the age of 64 in Gaston Memorial Hospital located in Gastonia, North Carolina. He had been ill for some time, but his obituary did not state his cause of death.
