= Claude Barnes =

American civil-rights campaigner, professor

Claude W Barnes Jr.
- Born: 1952[?]

Claude Barnes (born 1952[?]) is an American civil rights leader for 40 years and a former professor, who was convicted in 2010 of embezzling the estate of his deceased neighbor.

== School ==
As a teenager, Barnes attended Dudley High School, an all black school in Greensboro, North Carolina. Barnes was an advocate of Black Power, who was active in two black-separatist movements called the "Greensboro Association of Poor People" and "Students Organized for Black Unity". In Spring 1969, Barnes was 17 and the junior class president. Teachers of both races perceived Barnes to be the puppet of Nelson Johnson, who was a university student and the leader of Greensboro Association of Poor People.

The school held student government elections on 2 May 1969, and about 600 students wrote Barnes' name on the ballot for student president. The election committee decided that these votes were invalid, and declared Connie Herbin who received 200 votes as the winner. This led to protests by students both from the school and nearby North Carolina Agricultural and Technical State University; on 21 May 1969 a man was killed during a shooting between students and the police; the National Guard was called in, and early the next day the mayor declared a state of emergency in Greensboro. Disturbances continued until 24 May. These events are known as the Greensboro Rebellion.

== University student ==
Barnes studied political science at North Carolina Agricultural and Technical State University, in Greensboro, graduating with a BA in 1979. He then studied political science at Clark Atlanta University in Atlanta, Georgia, from which he received an MA in 1982 for his thesis "A Consideration of the Relationship between Ideology and Activism in the Black Nationalist Movement: A Case Study of the Rise and Fall of the Greensboro Association of Poor People". Clark Atlanta University awarded him a PhD in 1991 for his dissertation: "Political Power and Economic Dependence: An Analysis of Atlanta's Black Urban Regime".

== University lecturer ==
Barnes held a series of jobs as a lecturer in political science at: North Carolina A&T State University (1982–82), Georgia Institute of Technology (1983–84), and Gainesville College (1984–88). He was visiting professor in political science at Georgia State University (1988–89). He then completed his PhD at Clark Atlanta University. Barnes was assistant professor in political science at South Carolina State University (1992–93).

Barnes was appointed assistant professor of political science at North Carolina A&T State University in 1993, becoming an associate professor in 1998. He served as chairman of the department of political science from 2000 to 2002, and Associate Dean for Research, Operations and Assessment for the College of Arts and Sciences from 2002 to 2004. Barnes also served as Associate Professor of Political Science and Director of the GIS-CATI Laboratory (Geographic Information Systems and Computer Assisted Telephone Interviewing Laboratory) from 1998 to 2009. He specialised in: "urban transportation, public policy, research methodology and the impact of racial discrimination on public policy". Barnes was a well-liked professor who was an inspiration to students. Barnes retired from the university on 28 February 2009.

=== Documentary on the events of 1969 ===
Michael Anthony Williams spent from 2002 to 2008 making a documentary film about the 1969 Greensboro Rebellion, called Walls that bleed. Barnes helped with the film, and also provided $10,000 to help fund it. The website for this documentary includes an introduction by Barnes.

=== Greensboro Truth and Community Reconciliation Project ===
Greensboro Truth and Community Reconciliation Project was set up to study an incident where five people were killed at an anti-Ku Klux Klan rally in 1979. Barnes gave evidence to the first public hearing of the Greensboro Truth and Community Reconciliation Project on 15 July 2005. Barnes said that there was "a connection between '79, '69, 1960, 1955, however far you want to go back. People who stand up for social justice and righteousness get attacked by the government, by the Klan, and by all those who stand for reaction and the lack of progress." He said that "all of us are not sharing in this American dream. In fact, to many of us it is an American nightmare. And we haven’t woke up yet."

== Embezzlement ==
Betty Irene Burton was a neighbor of Barnes, and died of cancer aged 76 on 8 October 2008. She had been a friend of Barnes for many years, and made him executor of her will. The will left her assets to her children who lived in other US states. Instead, Barnes worked with Koretta Ann King (the deceased's in-home nurse), Andrea Lee Barksdale and Alex Habersham to embezzle the estate. Barnes transferred the house and property (worth $200,000) to his ex-wife. King and Barksdale fraudulently closed the deceased's annuity receiving a cheque for $93,600, which Barnes deposited in the estate's bank account, and then shared with the group. King, Barksdale and Habersham opened credit card accounts in the deceased's name. Barnes spent approximately $14,000 of the deceased's money to buy a laptop computer, attend the inauguration of Barack Obama, and rent cars.

King was at the time on federal probation for other financial charges, and the police noticed suspicious financial transactions in her name. This led to the arrests of the four in the first week in April 2009.

After his arrest, Barnes cooperated with the police. Barnes was accused of mail fraud, identity theft and engaging in monetary transactions from unlawful activity. At his trial Barnes pleaded guilty to these charges, and expressed remorse. He was sentenced to two and a half years in prison and ordered to pay $38,000 in restitution. The other three also pleaded guilty. The deceased's family expressed disappointment with how light Barnes' sentence was.

The deceased's estate was worth about $400,000. As a result of the fraud, the deceased's family received $122,000 less than they would have done.

== Publications ==
1. Black Mecca Reconsidered: Atlanta's Post-civil Rights Political Economy, found in: M Lashly and MN Jackson (editors), African Americans and the New Policy Consensus: Retreat of the Liberal State? pub Greenwood Press, September 1994.
2. An Analysis of Service Equity in Urban Transit Using GIS Technology: A Case Study Atlanta, by C Barnes, Georgia, pub Urban Transit Institute, North Carolina A&T State University, USDOT, Research and Special Programs Administration, Washington, 1995.
3. Equity in Urban Transportation: Baltimore, MD and Washington, DC, by C Barnes and J Mack, The National McNair Journal, Autumn 1996.
4. Developing and Maintaining Partnerships for Multimodal Transportation Planning, by C Barnes, EW Hauser, AR Breese, SA Martin, et al., pub National Cooperative Highway Research Program, 1997.
5. American National and State Government: An African American View of the Return of Redemptionist Politics, C Barnes, SA Moseley and JD Steele (editors), pub Kendall/Hunt Press, 1997, revised edition, 2000, ISBN 0-7872-7485-2. Barnes also wrote the chapter: Bullet Holes in the Wall: Reflections on the Dudley-A&T Student Revolt.
6. An Analysis of Service Equity in Urban Transit: Baltimore and MTA, by C Barnes, pub Urban Transit Institute, North Carolina A&T State University, USDOT, Research and Special Programs Administration, Greensboro, North Carolina, 1998.
7. Work Related Travel Patterns of People of Color, by C Barnes and R Krovi, found in, Travel Patterns of People of Color, pub USDOT, Federal Highway Administration, 2000.
8. Closing the Gaping Holes, found in: H Seiber, Drinking Gourds of Guilford: A Story of Change: 1771–2005, pub Stanford Publishers, 2005.
9. Climbing Out of the Abyss: Racism, Capitalism and Kerner at 40, by C Barnes, found in: Wickham and Zubari (editors), Justice: Kerner at 40, pub Acura Foundation, 2008.
10. Truth is the First Casualty of War and Presidential Politics, by C Barnes, Tempo News, 3 May 2008.
11. Infidelity and the Tragedy of American Politics, by C Barnes, Tempo News, 14 August 2008.
12. Research Methods in Political Science, by C Barnes, pub Cengage Publications, 2008.
13. Katrina and Its Children, C Barnes and J Steele, found in, S Lewis, (editor), Historical Inevitability: the Role of Hurricane Katrina in the New Orleans Saga, pub Omnipress, 2009.

Barnes also contributed to the Kerner Plus 40 Report, by T Zuberi and D Wickham, pub University of Pennsylvania, 2008.
