= Bibliography of the history of the Ku Klux Klan =

List of works about the Ku Klux Klan

Bibliography of the Ku Klux Klan
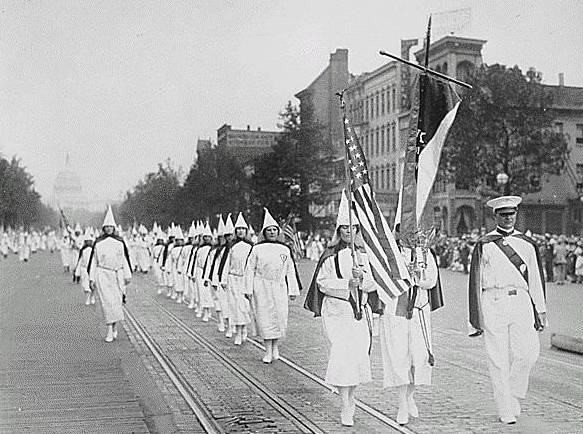
- Klan members march down Pennsylvania Avenue in Washington, D.C.
- Topic: Ku Klux Klan
- Eras covered: Reconstruction; second Klan; civil rights era and after
- Publication dates: 1927–2026
- Language: English

Ku Klux Klan
- The Mystic Insignia of a Klansman, commonly known as the Blood Drop Cross, became the best-known emblem of the organization during the early 20th century.
- Political position: Far-right

First Klan (1865–1872)
- Founded in: Pulaski, Tennessee, U.S.
- Political ideologies: Anti-black racism; White supremacy; White nationalism; Nativism; Vigilantism; Segregationism (Note: The Ku Klux Klan opposed the civil rights and Black rights movements, and often killed Black people that either committed crimes, or simply exercised their rights of voting, owning guns, land, etc.)

Second Klan (1915–1944)
- Founded in: Stone Mountain, Georgia, U.S.
- Members: c. 3 million – 6 million (Note: Peaked in 1924–1925)
- Political ideologies (Note: In addition to previous Klan ideologies): Anglo-Saxonism; Right-wing populism; Homophobia; Antisemitism; Anti-atheism; Anti-Catholicism

Third Klan (1946/1950–present)
- Founded in: Stone Mountain, Georgia, U.S.
- Members: c. 5,000–8,000
- Political ideologies: Social conservatism (Note: The Third KKK is anti-feminist, anti-abortion, and anti-LGBT.); Anti-miscegenation; Anti-globalization; Islamophobia

This is a bibliography of the Ku Klux Klan. The bibliography concentrates on historical scholarship; a small number of works from sociology, economics, political science, and law are included where they bear directly on the history of the Klan.

The Ku Klux Klan is a white supremacist organization that has appeared in three distinct forms over the course of American history. The first Klan was created in Pulaski, Tennessee, by six Confederate veterans at the end of the Civil War; its members engaged in terrorism during Reconstruction, and the organization disbanded once it became evident that Jim Crow laws would ensure the continuation of white supremacy in the South. The Klan was revived by white Protestants near Atlanta, Georgia, in 1915, and by 1925, when its followers marched in Washington, D.C., it had as many as four million members. After the Second World War various groups organized under the Klan name in reaction to the civil rights movement and school desegregation, and Klansmen were responsible for some of the most notorious acts of violence of the period, including the 16th Street Baptist Church bombing in Birmingham, Alabama, in 1963, which killed four young African American girls, and the murder of three civil rights workers in Mississippi in 1964.

Bibliography contains academic level English language books (including translations) and journal articles, published mainly post World War II. (Note: Works published before World War II should be limited to areas where there is no significant post World War II books on the subject or when the work in question has significant historical merit.) Book entries may have references to reviews published in academic journals or major newspapers when these could be considered helpful. These reference reviews also function as a resource to find other works on this subject.

Works listed here are cited in the notes or bibliographies of scholarly sources. Each is published by an academic or major trade press, written by a recognized expert, or substantially reviewed in scholarly journals; borderline cases are omitted. A selection of primary sources are included. Many of the books below carry their own bibliographies; see Further reading section for longer ones, and External links section for historical sites and museums.

Citations follow APA style. (Note: Entries are in plain text APA 7 format without templates; templates are used only for reviews and notes.) Books have citations to academic journals or mainstream published reviews when available. For books only partly about the subject, give relevant chapter or section titles where useful and available. Translators of the original-language edition are included when possible. In cases where a title or name has appeared with more than one English spelling, use the most recent published form is used and a footnote documents any earlier title under which the work appeared.

== General works ==
- Newton, M. (2014). White robes and burning crosses: A history of the Ku Klux Klan from 1866. McFarland.
- Quarles, C. L. (1999). The Ku Klux Klan and related American racialist and antisemitic organizations: A history and analysis. McFarland.

== The confederacy and the Klan ==
- Brown, W. L. (1997). A life of Albert Pike. University of Arkansas Press.
- Eckert, R. L. (1989). John Brown Gordon: Soldier, southerner, American. Louisiana State University Press.
- Hurst, J. (1993). Nathan Bedford Forrest: A biography. Knopf.
- Ward, A. (2005). River run red: The Fort Pillow massacre in the American Civil War. Viking.
- Wills, B. S. (1992). A battle from the start: The life of Nathan Bedford Forrest. HarperCollins.
- Wills, B. S. (2014). The river was dyed with blood: Nathan Bedford Forrest and Fort Pillow. University of Oklahoma Press.

== Reconstruction-era Klan ==
- Bordewich, F. M. (2023). Klan war: Ulysses S. Grant and the battle to save Reconstruction. Alfred A. Knopf.
- Bradley, M. L. (2009). Bluecoats and Tar Heels: Soldiers and civilians in Reconstruction North Carolina. University Press of Kentucky.
- Budiansky, S. (2008). The bloody shirt: Terror after Appomattox. Viking.
- Cardyn, L. (2002). Sexualized racism/gendered violence: Outraging the body politic in the Reconstruction South. Michigan Law Review, 100(4), 675–867.
- Emberton, C. (2013). Beyond redemption: Race, violence, and the American South after the Civil War. University of Chicago Press.
- Gugliotta, G. (2025). Grant's enforcer: Taking down the Klan. University of Georgia Press.
- Hurst, J. (1993). Nathan Bedford Forrest: A biography. Knopf.
- Lane, C. (2019). Freedom's detective: The Secret Service, the Ku Klux Klan and the man who masterminded America's first war on terror. Hanover Square Press.
- Martinez, J. M. (2007). Carpetbaggers, cavalry, and the Ku Klux Klan: Exposing the invisible empire during Reconstruction. Rowman & Littlefield.
- Nelson, S. R. (1999). Iron confederacies: Southern railways, Klan violence, and Reconstruction. University of North Carolina Press.
- Parsons, E. F. (2005). Midnight rangers: Costume and performance in the Reconstruction-era Ku Klux Klan. Journal of American History, 92(3), 811–836. JSTOR 3659969
- Parsons, E. F. (2011). Klan skepticism and denial in Reconstruction-era public discourse. The Journal of Southern History, 77(1), 53–90. JSTOR 27919387
- Parsons, E. F. (2015). Ku-Klux: The birth of the Klan during Reconstruction. University of North Carolina Press. doi:10.5149/northcarolina/9781469625423.001.0001
- Robb, F. O. (2017). "Two men in Ku Klux Klan disguises": A photograph from Reconstruction Alabama. Alabama Review, 70(3), 222–246. doi:10.1353/ala.2017.0015
- Rosen, H. (2009). Terror in the heart of freedom: Citizenship, sexual violence, and the meaning of race in the postemancipation South. University of North Carolina Press.
- Severance, B. H. (2005). Tennessee's radical army: The State Guard and its role in Reconstruction, 1867–1869. University of Tennessee Press.
- Snay, M. (2007). Fenians, freedmen, and southern whites: Race and nationality in the era of Reconstruction. Louisiana State University Press.
- Wang, X. (1997). The trial of democracy: Black suffrage and northern Republicans, 1860–1910. University of Georgia Press.
- West, J. L. (2002). The Reconstruction Ku Klux Klan in York County, South Carolina, 1865–1877. McFarland.
- Williams, K. E. (2012). They left great marks on me: African American testimonies of racial violence from emancipation to World War I. New York University Press.
- Williams, K. E. (2023). I saw death coming: A history of terror and survival in the war against Reconstruction. Bloomsbury.
- Williams, L. F. (1996). The great South Carolina Ku Klux Klan trials, 1871–1872. University of Georgia Press.
- Zuczek, R. (1996). State of rebellion: Reconstruction in South Carolina. University of South Carolina Press.

== Second Klan (1915–1944) ==
- Baker, K. J. (2011). Gospel according to the Klan: The KKK's appeal to Protestant America, 1915–1930. University Press of Kansas.
- Barnes, K. C. (2017). Another look behind the masks: The Ku Klux Klan in Bentonville, Arkansas, 1922–1926. The Arkansas Historical Quarterly, 76(3), 191–217. JSTOR 26291365
- Barnes, K. C. (2021). The Ku Klux Klan in 1920s Arkansas: How Protestant white nationalism came to rule a state. University of Arkansas Press.
- Blee, K. M. (1991). Women in the 1920s' Ku Klux Klan movement. Feminist Studies, 17(1), 57–77. JSTOR 3178170
- Blee, K. M. (1991). Women of the Klan: Racism and gender in the 1920s. University of California Press.
- Craig, J. (2014). Ku Klux Klan in western Pennsylvania, 1921–1928. Lehigh University Press.
- Feldman, G. (1999). Politics, society, and the Klan in Alabama, 1915–1949. University of Alabama Press.
- Fox, C. (2011). Everyday Klansfolk: White Protestant life and the KKK in 1920s Michigan. Michigan State University Press.
- Fryer, R. G., & Levitt, S. D. (2012). Hatred and profits: Under the hood of the Ku Klux Klan. Quarterly Journal of Economics, 127(4), 1883–1925. doi:10.1093/qje/qjs028
- Gordon, L. (2017). The second coming of the KKK: The Ku Klux Klan of the 1920s and the American political tradition. Liveright.
- Harcourt, F. (2017). Ku Klux kulture: America and the Klan in the 1920s. University of Chicago Press.
- Hernandez, M. (2019). The Ku Klux Klan and Freemasonry in 1920s America: Fighting fraternities. Routledge.
- Holley, D. (2001). A look behind the masks: The 1920s Ku Klux Klan in Monticello, Arkansas. The Arkansas Historical Quarterly, 60(2), 131–150. JSTOR 40031018
- Horowitz, D. A. (Ed.). (1999). Inside the Klavern: The secret history of a Ku Klux Klan of the 1920s. Southern Illinois University Press.
- Jenkins, W. D. (1990). Steel Valley Klan: The Ku Klux Klan in Ohio's Mahoning Valley. Kent State University Press.
- Kendall, A. G. (2011). Freemasonry and the second Ku Klux Klan in California, 1921–1925. Journal for Research into Freemasonry and Fraternalism, 2(1), 123–143. doi:10.1558/jrff.v2i1.123
- Laackman, D. W. (2020). Selling hate: Marketing the Ku Klux Klan. University of Georgia Press.
- Laats, A. (2012). Red schoolhouse, burning cross: The Ku Klux Klan of the 1920s and educational reform. History of Education Quarterly, 52(3), 323–350. doi:10.1111/j.1748-5959.2012.00402.x
- Law, S. (2026). Peddlers of hate: How the Ku Klux Klan seized power in 1920s Oregon. Oregon State University Press.
- Lay, S. (1995). Hooded knights on the Niagara: The Ku Klux Klan in Buffalo, New York. New York University Press.
- Lay, S. (Ed.). (1992). The invisible empire in the West: Toward a new historical appraisal of the Ku Klux Klan of the 1920s. University of Illinois Press.
- Lutholtz, M. W. (1991). Grand Dragon: D. C. Stephenson and the Ku Klux Klan in Indiana. Purdue University Press.
- MacLean, N. (1994). Behind the mask of chivalry: The making of the second Ku Klux Klan. Oxford University Press. doi:10.1093/oso/9780195072341.001.0001
- Madison, J. H. (2020). The Ku Klux Klan in the heartland. Indiana University Press.
- McDonald, J. (2023). "Watch Adair Kounty Klan grow": The second Ku Klux Klan in Kirksville, Missouri, 1923–1925. Missouri Historical Review, 118(1), 1–24. doi:10.1353/msh.2023.a992956
- McVeigh, R. (2009). The rise of the Ku Klux Klan: Right-wing movements and national politics. University of Minnesota Press.
- Moore, L. J. (1991). Citizen Klansmen: The Ku Klux Klan in Indiana, 1921–1928. University of North Carolina Press.
- Pegram, T. R. (2008). Hoodwinked: The Anti-Saloon League and the Ku Klux Klan in 1920s Prohibition enforcement. The Journal of the Gilded Age and Progressive Era, 7(1), 89–119. doi:10.1017/s1537781400001742
- Pegram, T. R. (2011). One hundred percent American: The rebirth and decline of the Ku Klux Klan in the 1920s. Ivan R. Dee.
- Pitsula, J. M. (2013). Keeping Canada British: The Ku Klux Klan in 1920s Saskatchewan. University of British Columbia Press.
- Rawlings, W. (2016). The second coming of the invisible empire: The Ku Klux Klan of the 1920s. Mercer University Press.
- Rice, T. (2015). White robes, silver screens: Movies and the making of the Ku Klux Klan. Indiana University Press.
- Richard, M. P. (2009). "This is not a Catholic nation": The Ku Klux Klan confronts Franco-Americans in Maine. The New England Quarterly, 82(2), 285–303. doi:10.1162/tneq.2009.82.2.285
- Richard, M. P. (2015). Not a Catholic nation: The Ku Klux Klan confronts New England in the 1920s. University of Massachusetts Press.

== Civil rights era and after (post 1945) ==
- Ball, H. (2004). Murder in Mississippi: United States v. Price and the struggle for civil rights. University Press of Kansas.
- Belew, K. (2018). Bring the war home: The white power movement and paramilitary America. Harvard University Press.
- Bermanzohn, S. A. (2003). Through survivors' eyes: From the sixties to the Greensboro massacre. Vanderbilt University Press.
- Blee, K. M. (2002). Inside organized racism: Women in the hate movement. University of California Press.
- Chalmers, D. M. (2003). Backfire: How the Ku Klux Klan helped the civil rights movement. Rowman & Littlefield.
- Cunningham, D. (2004). There's something happening here: The New Left, the Klan, and FBI counterintelligence. University of California Press.
- Cunningham, D., & Phillips, B. T. (2007). Contexts for mobilization: Spatial settings and Klan presence in North Carolina, 1964–1966. American Journal of Sociology, 113(3), 781–814. doi:10.1086/521843
- Cunningham, D. (2013). Klansville, U.S.A.: The rise and fall of the civil rights-era Ku Klux Klan. Oxford University Press. doi:10.1093/acprof:oso/9780199752027.001.0001
- Drabble, J. (2007). From white supremacy to white power: The FBI, COINTELPRO-WHITE HATE, and the Nazification of the Ku Klux Klan in the 1970s. American Studies, 48(3), 49–74.
- Drabble, J. (2008). The FBI, COINTELPRO-WHITE HATE, and the decline of Ku Klux Klan organizations in Alabama, 1964–1971. Alabama Review, 61(1), 3–47. doi:10.1353/ala.2008.0016
- Green, B. (1999). Before his time: The untold story of Harry T. Moore, America's first civil rights martyr. Free Press.
- Greenhaw, W. (2011). Fighting the devil in Dixie: How civil rights activists took on the Ku Klux Klan in Alabama. Lawrence Hill Books.
- Heikkilä, N. (2021). Racial myths and the civil rights-era Ku Klux Klan. American Studies in Scandinavia, 53(1), 21–41. doi:10.22439/asca.v53i1.6224
- Leamer, L. (2016). The lynching: The epic courtroom battle that brought down the Klan. William Morrow.
- May, G. (2005). The informant: The FBI, the Ku Klux Klan, and the murder of Viola Liuzzo. Yale University Press.
- Mitchell, J. (2020). Race against time: A reporter reopens the unsolved murder cases of the civil rights era. Simon & Schuster.
- Nelson, J. (1993). Terror in the night: The Klan's campaign against the Jews. Simon & Schuster.
- Newton, M. (2001). The invisible empire: The Ku Klux Klan in Florida. University Press of Florida.
- Shetterly, A. (2024). Morningside: The 1979 Greensboro massacre and the struggle for an American city's soul. Amistad.
- Waller, S. (2002). Love and revolution: A political memoir: People's history of the Greensboro massacre, its setting and aftermath. Rowman & Littlefield.
- Webb, C. (2010). Rabble rousers: The American far right in the civil rights era. University of Georgia Press.
- Zeskind, L. (2009). Blood and politics: The history of the white nationalist movement from the margins to the mainstream. Farrar, Straus and Giroux.

== Opposition, prosecution and federal response ==
=== Reconstruction ===
- Bordewich, F. M. (2023). Klan war: Ulysses S. Grant and the battle to save Reconstruction. Alfred A. Knopf.
- Brandwein, P. (2011). Rethinking the judicial settlement of Reconstruction. Cambridge University Press.
- Cresswell, S. (1991). Mormons & cowboys, moonshiners & Klansmen: Federal law enforcement in the South & West, 1870–1893. University of Alabama Press.
- Gugliotta, G. (2025). Grant's enforcer: Taking down the Klan. University of Georgia Press.
- Lane, C. (2019). Freedom's detective: The Secret Service, the Ku Klux Klan and the man who masterminded America's first war on terror. Hanover Square Press.
- Martinez, J. M. (2007). Carpetbaggers, cavalry, and the Ku Klux Klan: Exposing the invisible empire during Reconstruction. Rowman & Littlefield.
- Severance, B. H. (2005). Tennessee's radical army: The State Guard and its role in Reconstruction, 1867–1869. University of Tennessee Press.
- Wang, X. (1997). The trial of democracy: Black suffrage and northern Republicans, 1860–1910. University of Georgia Press.
- Williams, L. F. (1993). The South Carolina Ku Klux Klan trials and enforcement of federal rights, 1871–1872. Civil War History, 39(1), 47–66. doi:10.1353/cwh.1993.0070
- Williams, L. F. (1996). The great South Carolina Ku Klux Klan trials, 1871–1872. University of Georgia Press.
- Zuczek, R. (1996). State of rebellion: Reconstruction in South Carolina. University of South Carolina Press.

=== Second Klan era ===
- Craig, J. M. (2005). "There is hell going on up there": The Carnegie Klan riot of 1923. Pennsylvania History, 72(3), 322–346. JSTOR 27778683
- Goldberg, D. J. (1996). Unmasking the Ku Klux Klan: The northern movement against the KKK, 1920–1925. Journal of American Ethnic History, 15(4), 32–48. JSTOR 27502105
- Madison, J. H. (2020). The Klan's enemies step up, slowly. Indiana Magazine of History, 116(2), 93–120. doi:10.2979/indimagahist.116.2.01
- Tucker, T. (2018). Notre Dame vs. the Klan: How the Fighting Irish defied the KKK. University of Notre Dame Press.

=== Civil rights era and after ===
- Ball, H. (2004). Murder in Mississippi: United States v. Price and the struggle for civil rights. University Press of Kansas.
- Chalmers, D. M. (2003). Backfire: How the Ku Klux Klan helped the civil rights movement. Rowman & Littlefield.
- Cunningham, D. (2004). There's something happening here: The New Left, the Klan, and FBI counterintelligence. University of California Press.
- Drabble, J. (2007). From white supremacy to white power: The FBI, COINTELPRO-WHITE HATE, and the Nazification of the Ku Klux Klan in the 1970s. American Studies, 48(3), 49–74.
- Drabble, J. (2008). The FBI, COINTELPRO-WHITE HATE, and the decline of Ku Klux Klan organizations in Alabama, 1964–1971. Alabama Review, 61(1), 3–47. doi:10.1353/ala.2008.0016
- Greenhaw, W. (2011). Fighting the devil in Dixie: How civil rights activists took on the Ku Klux Klan in Alabama. Lawrence Hill Books.
- Hill, L. (2004). The Deacons for Defense: Armed resistance and the civil rights movement. University of North Carolina Press.
- Leamer, L. (2016). The lynching: The epic courtroom battle that brought down the Klan. William Morrow.
- May, G. (2005). The informant: The FBI, the Ku Klux Klan, and the murder of Viola Liuzzo. Yale University Press.
- Mitchell, J. (2020). Race against time: A reporter reopens the unsolved murder cases of the civil rights era. Simon & Schuster.
- Romano, R. C. (2014). Racial reckoning: Prosecuting America's civil rights murders. Harvard University Press.
- Strain, C. B. (2005). Pure fire: Self-defense as activism in the civil rights era. University of Georgia Press.
- Turner, J. P. (2018). Selma and the Liuzzo murder trials: The first modern civil rights convictions. University of Michigan Press. doi:10.3998/mpub.9753373
- Tyson, T. B. (1999). Radio Free Dixie: Robert F. Williams and the roots of Black power. University of North Carolina Press.
- Umoja, A. O. (2013). We will shoot back: Armed resistance in the Mississippi freedom movement. New York University Press.

== Women and gender ==
=== Reconstruction and Jim Crow ===
- Cardyn, L. (2002). Sexualized racism/gendered violence: Outraging the body politic in the Reconstruction South. Michigan Law Review, 100(4), 675–867.
- Emberton, C. (2013). Beyond redemption: Race, violence, and the American South after the Civil War. University of Chicago Press.
- Feimster, C. N. (2009). Southern horrors: Women and the politics of rape and lynching. Harvard University Press.
- Freedman, E. B. (2013). Redefining rape: Sexual violence in the era of suffrage and segregation. Harvard University Press.
- Hodes, M. (1997). White women, Black men: Illicit sex in the nineteenth-century South. Yale University Press.
- Parsons, E. F. (2005). Midnight rangers: Costume and performance in the Reconstruction-era Ku Klux Klan. Journal of American History, 92(3), 811–836. JSTOR 3659969
- Parsons, E. F. (2015). Ku-Klux: The birth of the Klan during Reconstruction. University of North Carolina Press. doi:10.5149/northcarolina/9781469625423.001.0001
- Rosen, H. (2009). Terror in the heart of freedom: Citizenship, sexual violence, and the meaning of race in the postemancipation South. University of North Carolina Press.

=== Second Klan era ===
- Blee, K. M. (1991). Women in the 1920s' Ku Klux Klan movement. Feminist Studies, 17(1), 57–77. JSTOR 3178170
- Blee, K. M. (1991). Women of the Klan: Racism and gender in the 1920s. University of California Press.
- Dumenil, L. (1995). Revising the Klan: Intersections of race, gender, and class in the 1920s Ku Klux Klan. Radical History Review, (62), 244–247. doi:10.1215/01636545-1995-62-244
- Egan, T. (2023). A fever in the heartland: The Ku Klux Klan's plot to take over America, and the woman who stopped them. Viking.
- MacLean, N. (1994). Behind the mask of chivalry: The making of the second Ku Klux Klan. Oxford University Press. doi:10.1093/oso/9780195072341.001.0001

=== Civil rights era and after ===
- Blee, K. M. (2002). Inside organized racism: Women in the hate movement. University of California Press.
- Stanton, M. (1998). From Selma to sorrow: The life and death of Viola Liuzzo. University of Georgia Press.

== Religion ==
=== Protestantism and Klan theology ===
- Baker, K. J. (2011). Gospel according to the Klan: The KKK's appeal to Protestant America, 1915–1930. University Press of Kansas.
- Barkun, M. (1994). Religion and the racist right: The origins of the Christian Identity movement. University of North Carolina Press.
- Barnes, K. C. (2021). The Ku Klux Klan in 1920s Arkansas: How Protestant white nationalism came to rule a state. University of Arkansas Press.
- Forsell, G. (2020). Blood, cross and flag: The influence of race on Ku Klux Klan theology in the 1920s. Politics, Religion & Ideology, 21(3), 269–287. doi:10.1080/21567689.2020.1809384
- George, C. V. R. (2015). One Mississippi, two Mississippi: Methodists, murder, and the struggle for racial justice in Neshoba County. Oxford University Press.
- Marsh, C. (1997). God's long summer: Stories of faith and civil rights. Princeton University Press.

=== Anti-Catholicism ===
- Abrams, P. (2009). Cross purposes: Pierce v. Society of Sisters and the struggle over compulsory public education. University of Michigan Press.
- Richard, M. P. (2009). "This is not a Catholic nation": The Ku Klux Klan confronts Franco-Americans in Maine. The New England Quarterly, 82(2), 285–303. doi:10.1162/tneq.2009.82.2.285
- Richard, M. P. (2015). Not a Catholic nation: The Ku Klux Klan confronts New England in the 1920s. University of Massachusetts Press.
- Trollinger, W. V. (2013). Hearing the silence: The University of Dayton, the Ku Klux Klan, and Catholic universities and colleges in the 1920s. American Catholic Studies, 124(1), 1–21. doi:10.1353/acs.2013.0000
- Tucker, T. (2018). Notre Dame vs. the Klan: How the Fighting Irish defied the KKK. University of Notre Dame Press.

=== Antisemitism and Jewish responses ===
- Nelson, J. (1993). Terror in the night: The Klan's campaign against the Jews. Simon & Schuster.
- Webb, C. (2001). Fight against fear: Southern Jews and Black civil rights. University of Georgia Press.
- Whitfield, S. (2024). American Jews face the Ku Klux Klan, 1865–2025. Jewish History, 38(3–4), 153–185. doi:10.1007/s10835-025-09469-5

== Ritual, symbols and language ==
- Baker, K. J. (2011). Gospel according to the Klan: The KKK's appeal to Protestant America, 1915–1930. University Press of Kansas.
- Blee, K. M., & McDowell, A. (2013). The duality of spectacle and secrecy: A case study of fraternalism in the 1920s US Ku Klux Klan. Ethnic and Racial Studies, 36(2), 249–265. doi:10.1080/01419870.2012.676197
- Forsell, G. (2020). Blood, cross and flag: The influence of race on Ku Klux Klan theology in the 1920s. Politics, Religion & Ideology, 21(3), 269–287. doi:10.1080/21567689.2020.1809384
- Harcourt, F. (2017). Ku Klux kulture: America and the Klan in the 1920s. University of Chicago Press.
- Hernandez, M. (2019). The Ku Klux Klan and Freemasonry in 1920s America: Fighting fraternities. Routledge.
- Jacobs, M. (2010). Co-opting Christian chorales: Songs of the Ku Klux Klan. American Music, 28(3), 368–377. doi:10.5406/americanmusic.28.3.0368
- Kendall, A. G. (2011). Freemasonry and the second Ku Klux Klan in California, 1921–1925. Journal for Research into Freemasonry and Fraternalism, 2(1), 123–143. doi:10.1558/jrff.v2i1.123
- Laackman, D. W. (2020). Selling hate: Marketing the Ku Klux Klan. University of Georgia Press.
- Parsons, E. F. (2005). Midnight rangers: Costume and performance in the Reconstruction-era Ku Klux Klan. Journal of American History, 92(3), 811–836. JSTOR 3659969
- Parsons, E. F. (2015). Ku-Klux: The birth of the Klan during Reconstruction. University of North Carolina Press. doi:10.5149/northcarolina/9781469625423.001.0001
- Robb, F. O. (2017). "Two men in Ku Klux Klan disguises": A photograph from Reconstruction Alabama. Alabama Review, 70(3), 222–246. doi:10.1353/ala.2017.0015

== Klan politics and elections ==
=== Reconstruction ===
- Wang, X. (1997). The trial of democracy: Black suffrage and northern Republicans, 1860–1910. University of Georgia Press.
- Zuczek, R. (1996). State of rebellion: Reconstruction in South Carolina. University of South Carolina Press.

=== Second Klan era ===
- Abrams, P. (2009). Cross purposes: Pierce v. Society of Sisters and the struggle over compulsory public education. University of Michigan Press.
- Barnes, K. C. (2021). The Ku Klux Klan in 1920s Arkansas: How Protestant white nationalism came to rule a state. University of Arkansas Press.
- Egan, T. (2023). A fever in the heartland: The Ku Klux Klan's plot to take over America, and the woman who stopped them. Viking.
- Feldman, G. (1999). Politics, society, and the Klan in Alabama, 1915–1949. University of Alabama Press.
- Gordon, L. (2017). The second coming of the KKK: The Ku Klux Klan of the 1920s and the American political tradition. Liveright.
- Harcourt, F. (2025). The Klandidate: Senator Earle B. Mayfield and the Ku Klux Klan in federal politics. Journal of Right-Wing Studies, 3(2). doi:10.5070/rw3.43546
- Law, S. (2026). Peddlers of hate: How the Ku Klux Klan seized power in 1920s Oregon. Oregon State University Press.
- Lay, S. (Ed.). (1992). The invisible empire in the West: Toward a new historical appraisal of the Ku Klux Klan of the 1920s. University of Illinois Press.
- Lutholtz, M. W. (1991). Grand Dragon: D. C. Stephenson and the Ku Klux Klan in Indiana. Purdue University Press.
- McVeigh, R. (2009). The rise of the Ku Klux Klan: Right-wing movements and national politics. University of Minnesota Press.
- Moore, L. J. (1991). Citizen Klansmen: The Ku Klux Klan in Indiana, 1921–1928. University of North Carolina Press.
- Newman, R. K. (1994). Hugo Black: A biography. Pantheon Books.
- Pegram, T. R. (2008). Hoodwinked: The Anti-Saloon League and the Ku Klux Klan in 1920s Prohibition enforcement. The Journal of the Gilded Age and Progressive Era, 7(1), 89–119. doi:10.1017/s1537781400001742

=== Civil rights era and after ===
- Bridges, T. (1994). The rise of David Duke. University Press of Mississippi.
- Fairbanks, B. (2022). Wizards: David Duke, America's wildest election, and the rise of the far right. Vanderbilt University Press.
- Powell, L. N. (2000). Troubled memory: Anne Levy, the Holocaust, and David Duke's Louisiana. University of North Carolina Press.
- Rose, D. D. (Ed.). (1992). The emergence of David Duke and the politics of race. University of North Carolina Press.
- Webb, C. (2010). Rabble rousers: The American far right in the civil rights era. University of Georgia Press.
- Zeskind, L. (2009). Blood and politics: The history of the white nationalist movement from the margins to the mainstream. Farrar, Straus and Giroux.

== Ku Klux Klan in Canada ==
- Backhouse, C. (1999). Colour-coded: A legal history of racism in Canada, 1900–1950. University of Toronto Press.
- Baergen, W. P. (2000). The Ku Klux Klan in central Alberta. Central Alberta Historical Society.
- Barrett, S. R. (1987). Is God a racist? The right wing in Canada. University of Toronto Press.
- Bartley, A. (1995). A public nuisance: The Ku Klux Klan in Ontario 1923–27. Journal of Canadian Studies, 30(3), 156–174. doi:10.3138/jcs.30.3.156
- Bartley, A. (2020). The Ku Klux Klan in Canada: A century of promoting racism and hate in the peaceable kingdom. Formac.
- Parsons, T. (2024). The Ku Klux Klan and Ontario's evolving Britishness: A case study of Belleville and Hastings County. Ontario History, 116(1). doi:10.7202/1110096ar
- Pitsula, J. M. (2013). Keeping Canada British: The Ku Klux Klan in 1920s Saskatchewan. UBC Press. doi:10.59962/9780774824910
- Pitsula, J. M. (2014). Keeping Canada British: National identity and the Ku Klux Klan in 1920s Saskatchewan. In R. Rogers & C. Ramsay (Eds.), Overlooking Saskatchewan: Minding the gap (pp. 151–166). University of Regina Press. doi:10.1515/9780889773516-012
- Robin, M. (1992). Shades of right: Nativist and fascist politics in Canada, 1920–1940. University of Toronto Press.
- Sher, J. (1983). White hoods: Canada's Ku Klux Klan. New Star Books.

== Events related to the Ku Klux Klan ==
=== South Carolina Ku Klux Klan trials (1871–1872) ===
- Shapiro, H. (1964). The Ku Klux Klan during Reconstruction: The South Carolina episode. The Journal of Negro History, 49(1), 34–55. JSTOR 2716475
- Simkins, F. B. (1927). The Ku Klux Klan in South Carolina, 1868–1871. The Journal of Negro History, 12(4), 606–647. JSTOR 2714040
- Stagg, J. C. A. (1974). The problem of Klan violence: The South Carolina up-country, 1868–1871. Journal of American Studies, 8(3), 303–318. doi:10.1017/S0021875800015905
- Williams, L. F. (1993). The South Carolina Ku Klux Klan trials and enforcement of federal rights, 1871–1872. Civil War History, 39(1), 47–66. doi:10.1353/cwh.1993.0070
- Williams, L. F. (1996). The great South Carolina Ku Klux Klan trials, 1871–1872. University of Georgia Press.

=== Trial of D. C. Stephenson (1925) ===
- Egan, T. (2023). A fever in the heartland: The Ku Klux Klan's plot to take over America, and the woman who stopped them. Viking.
- Lutholtz, M. W. (1991). Grand Dragon: D. C. Stephenson and the Ku Klux Klan in Indiana. Purdue University Press.

=== Murders of Harry T. and Harriette Moore (1951) ===
- Green, B. (1999). Before his time: The untold story of Harry T. Moore, America's first civil rights martyr. Free Press.

=== 16th Street Baptist Church bombing (1963) ===
- Bass, S. J. (2001). Blessed are the peacemakers: Martin Luther King Jr., eight white religious leaders, and the "Letter from Birmingham Jail". Louisiana State University Press.
- Branch, T. (1988). Parting the waters: America in the King years, 1954–63. Simon & Schuster.
- Calloway, J. A. (2023). Clawing through bits of glass and bricks: James Baldwin and Reinhold Niebuhr on the Birmingham church bombing. Journal of Religious Ethics, 51(3), 474–495. doi:10.1111/jore.12434
- Cobbs, E. H., & Smith, P. J. (1994). Long time coming: An insider's story of the Birmingham church bombing that rocked the world. Crane Hill.
- Connerly, C. E. (2005). "The most segregated city in America": City planning and civil rights in Birmingham, 1920–1980. University of Virginia Press.
- Eskew, G. T. (1997). But for Birmingham: The local and national movements in the civil rights struggle. University of North Carolina Press.
- Hamlin, C. M. (1998). Behind the stained glass: A history of Sixteenth Street Baptist Church. Crane Hill.
- Huntley, H., & McKerley, J. W. (Eds.). (2009). Foot soldiers for democracy: The men, women, and children of the Birmingham civil rights movement. University of Illinois Press.
- Jones, D. (2019). Bending toward justice: The Birmingham church bombing that changed the course of civil rights. All Points Books.
- Manis, A. M. (1999). A fire you can't put out: The civil rights life of Birmingham's Reverend Fred Shuttlesworth. University of Alabama Press.
- May, G. (2005). The informant: The FBI, the Ku Klux Klan, and the murder of Viola Liuzzo. Yale University Press. doi:10.12987/yale/9780300106350.001.0001
- McKinstry, C. M., & George, D. (2011). While the world watched: A Birmingham bombing survivor comes of age during the civil rights movement. Tyndale House.
- McWhorter, D. (2001). Carry me home: Birmingham, Alabama: The climactic battle of the civil rights revolution. Simon & Schuster.
- Nunnelley, W. A. (1991). Bull Connor. University of Alabama Press.
- Romano, R. C. (2014). Racial reckoning: Prosecuting America's civil rights murders. Harvard University Press. doi:10.4159/9780674736177
- Sikora, F. (1991). Until justice rolls down: The Birmingham church bombing case. University of Alabama Press.
- Thorne, T. K. (2013). Last chance for justice: How relentless investigators uncovered new evidence convicting the Birmingham church bombers. Chicago Review Press.

=== Murders of Chaney, Goodman, and Schwerner (1964) ===
- Ball, H. (2004). Murder in Mississippi: United States v. Price and the struggle for civil rights. University Press of Kansas.
- Cagin, S., & Dray, P. (1988). We are not afraid: The story of Goodman, Schwerner, and Chaney and the civil rights campaign for Mississippi. Macmillan.
- George, C. V. R. (2015). One Mississippi, two Mississippi: Methodists, murder, and the struggle for racial justice in Neshoba County. Oxford University Press.
- Mars, F. (1977). Witness in Philadelphia. Louisiana State University Press.
- Walton, L. R. (2006). In their own backyard: Local press coverage of the Chaney, Goodman, and Schwerner murders. American Journalism, 23(3), 29–51. doi:10.1080/08821127.2006.10678024

=== Murder of Viola Liuzzo (1965) ===
- May, G. (2005). The informant: The FBI, the Ku Klux Klan, and the murder of Viola Liuzzo. Yale University Press.
- Stanton, M. (1998). From Selma to sorrow: The life and death of Viola Liuzzo. University of Georgia Press.
- Turner, J. P. (2018). Selma and the Liuzzo murder trials: The first modern civil rights convictions. University of Michigan Press. doi:10.3998/mpub.9753373

=== Bombings of Jewish targets in Mississippi (1967–1968) ===
- Bauman, M. K., & Kalin, B. (Eds.). (1997). The quiet voices: Southern rabbis and Black civil rights, 1880s to 1990s. University of Alabama Press.
- Billups, W. R. (2023). Martyred women and white power since the civil rights era: From Kathy Ainsworth to Vicki Weaver. Journal of American History, 109(4), 804–827. doi:10.1093/jahist/jaad002
- Chalmers, D. (2003). Backfire: How the Ku Klux Klan helped the civil rights movement. Rowman & Littlefield.
- Krause, P. A. (2016). To stand aside or stand alone: Southern Reform rabbis and the civil rights movement (M. K. Bauman & S. Krause, Eds.). University of Alabama Press.
- Marsh, C. (1997). God's long summer: Stories of faith and civil rights. Princeton University Press.
- Nelson, J. (1993). Terror in the night: The Klan's campaign against the Jews. Simon & Schuster.
- Nelson, J. (2013). Scoop: The evolution of a southern reporter (B. Matusow, Ed.). University Press of Mississippi.
- Newton, M. (2010). The Ku Klux Klan in Mississippi: A history. McFarland.
- Tarrants, T. A. (1979). The conversion of a Klansman: The story of a former Ku Klux Klan terrorist. Doubleday.
- Tarrants, T. A. (2019). Consumed by hate, redeemed by love: How a violent Klansman became a champion of racial reconciliation. Thomas Nelson.
- Wade, W. C. (1987). The fiery cross: The Ku Klux Klan in America. Simon & Schuster.
- Webb, C. (2001). Fight against fear: Southern Jews and Black civil rights. University of Georgia Press.
- Whitehead, D. (1970). Attack on terror: The FBI against the Ku Klux Klan in Mississippi. Funk & Wagnalls.
- Whitfield, S. (2024). American Jews face the Ku Klux Klan, 1865–2025. Jewish History, 38(3–4), 153–185. doi:10.1007/s10835-025-09469-5

=== Greensboro massacre (1979) ===
- Bermanzohn, S. A. (2003). Through survivors' eyes: From the sixties to the Greensboro massacre. Vanderbilt University Press.
- Packer, T. G. B. (2026). The history and afterlife of the 1979 Greensboro massacre: The dirt is still bloody. Routledge.
- Shetterly, A. (2024). Morningside: The 1979 Greensboro massacre and the struggle for an American city's soul. Amistad.
- Waller, S. (2002). Love and revolution: A political memoir: People's history of the Greensboro massacre, its setting and aftermath. Rowman & Littlefield.

=== Lynching of Michael Donald (1981) ===
- Leamer, L. (2016). The lynching: The epic courtroom battle that brought down the Klan. William Morrow.

== Historiography ==
Unlike the rest of this bibliography, this section includes works published from 1945 onward.

=== Historiographical essays and reappraisals ===
- Dumenil, L. (1995). Revising the Klan: Intersections of race, gender, and class in the 1920s Ku Klux Klan. Radical History Review, (62), 244–247. doi:10.1215/01636545-1995-62-244
- Lay, S. (Ed.). (1992). The invisible empire in the West: Toward a new historical appraisal of the Ku Klux Klan of the 1920s. University of Illinois Press.
- Moore, L. J. (1990). Historical interpretations of the 1920's Klan: The traditional view and the populist revision. Journal of Social History, 24(2), 341–357. doi:10.1353/jsh/24.2.341
- Parsons, E. F. (2011). Klan skepticism and denial in Reconstruction-era public discourse. The Journal of Southern History, 77(1), 53–90. JSTOR 27919387
- Smith, J. D., & Lowery, J. V. (Eds.). (2013). The Dunning School: Historians, race, and the meaning of Reconstruction. University Press of Kentucky.

=== Landmark studies, 1945–1989 ===
- Alexander, C. C. (1965). The Ku Klux Klan in the Southwest. University of Kentucky Press.
- Chalmers, D. M. (1965). Hooded Americanism: The first century of the Ku Klux Klan, 1865–1965. Doubleday.
- Goldberg, R. A. (1981). Hooded empire: The Ku Klux Klan in Colorado. University of Illinois Press.
- Jackson, K. T. (1967). The Ku Klux Klan in the city, 1915–1930. Oxford University Press.
- Miller, R. M. (1956). A note on the relationship between the Protestant churches and the revived Ku Klux Klan. The Journal of Southern History, 22(3), 355–368. JSTOR 2954550
- Rable, G. C. (1984). But there was no peace: The role of violence in the politics of Reconstruction. University of Georgia Press.
- Randel, W. P. (1965). The Ku Klux Klan: A century of infamy. Chilton Books.
- Rice, A. S. (1962). The Ku Klux Klan in American politics. Public Affairs Press.
- Trelease, A. W. (1971). White terror: The Ku Klux Klan conspiracy and southern Reconstruction. Harper & Row.
- Wade, W. C. (1987). The fiery cross: The Ku Klux Klan in America. Simon & Schuster.

=== Memory studies ===
Like the historiography section, this section includes works published from 1945 onward.

==== Reconstruction, the Lost Cause and the second Klan ====
- Ashdown, P., & Caudill, E. (2005). The myth of Nathan Bedford Forrest. Rowman & Littlefield.
- Baker, B. E. (2007). What Reconstruction meant: Historical memory in the American South. University of Virginia Press.
- Blight, D. W. (2001). Race and reunion: The Civil War in American memory. Harvard University Press.
- Carney, C. (2024). Reckoning with the devil: Nathan Bedford Forrest in myth and memory. Louisiana State University Press.
- Cimprich, J. (2005). Fort Pillow, a Civil War massacre, and public memory. Louisiana State University Press.
- Emberton, C., & Baker, B. E. (Eds.). (2017). Remembering Reconstruction: Struggles over the meaning of America's most turbulent era. Louisiana State University Press.
- Freeman, D. B. (1997). Carved in stone: The history of Stone Mountain. Mercer University Press.

==== Civil rights era and after ====
- Cunningham, D. (2008). Truth, reconciliation, and the Ku Klux Klan. Southern Cultures, 14(3), 68–87. doi:10.1353/scu.0.0018
- George, C. V. R. (2015). One Mississippi, two Mississippi: Methodists, murder, and the struggle for racial justice in Neshoba County. Oxford University Press.
- Magarrell, L., & Wesley, J. (2008). Learning from Greensboro: Truth and reconciliation in the United States. University of Pennsylvania Press.
- Packer, T. G. B. (2026). The history and afterlife of the 1979 Greensboro massacre: The dirt is still bloody. Routledge.
- Romano, R. C., & Raiford, L. (Eds.). (2006). The civil rights movement in American memory. University of Georgia Press.
- Romano, R. C. (2014). Racial reckoning: Prosecuting America's civil rights murders. Harvard University Press.

== Film and popular culture ==
=== The Birth of a Nation (1915) ===
- Benbow, M. E. (2010). Birth of a quotation: Woodrow Wilson and "Like writing history with lightning". The Journal of the Gilded Age and Progressive Era, 9(4), 509–533. doi:10.1017/s1537781400004242
- Carter, E. (1960). Cultural history written with lightning: The significance of The Birth of a Nation. American Quarterly, 12(3), 347–357. JSTOR 2710093
- Cripps, T. (1977). Slow fade to black: The Negro in American film, 1900–1942. Oxford University Press.
- Gaines, J. M. (2001). Fire and desire: Mixed-race movies in the silent era. University of Chicago Press. doi:10.7208/chicago/9780226278735.001.0001
- Gillespie, M. K., & Hall, R. L. (Eds.). (2006). Thomas Dixon Jr. and the birth of modern America. Louisiana State University Press.
- Gunning, T. (1991). D. W. Griffith and the origins of American narrative film: The early years at Biograph. University of Illinois Press.
- Lang, R. (Ed.). (1994). The Birth of a Nation: D. W. Griffith, director. Rutgers University Press.
- Lehr, D. (2014). The Birth of a Nation: How a legendary filmmaker and a crusading editor reignited America's Civil War. PublicAffairs.
- Lennig, A. (2004). Myth and fact: The reception of The Birth of a Nation. Film History, 16(2), 117–141. doi:10.2979/fil.2004.16.2.117
- Merritt, R. (1972). Dixon, Griffith, and the southern legend. Cinema Journal, 12(1), 26–45. JSTOR 1225402
- Olund, E. (2013). Geography written in lightning: Race, sexuality, and regulatory aesthetics in The Birth of a Nation. Annals of the Association of American Geographers, 103(4), 925–943. doi:10.1080/00045608.2011.653738
- Rogin, M. (1985). "The sword became a flashing vision": D. W. Griffith's The Birth of a Nation. Representations, 9, 150–195. JSTOR 3043769
- Schickel, R. (1984). D. W. Griffith: An American life. Simon & Schuster.
- Simmon, S. (1993). The films of D. W. Griffith. Cambridge University Press.
- Slide, A. (2004). American racist: The life and films of Thomas Dixon. University Press of Kentucky.
- Staiger, J. (1992). Interpreting films: Studies in the historical reception of American cinema. Princeton University Press. doi:10.1515/9780691216065
- Stewart, J. N. (2005). Migrating to the movies: Cinema and black urban modernity. University of California Press. doi:10.1525/9780520936409
- Stokes, M. (2007). D. W. Griffith's The Birth of a Nation: A history of "the most controversial motion picture of all time". Oxford University Press.
- Williams, L. (2001). Playing the race card: Melodramas of black and white from Uncle Tom to O. J. Simpson. Princeton University Press. doi:10.1515/9780691201337

=== Other ===
- Dessommes, N. B. (1999). Hollywood in hoods: The portrayal of the Ku Klux Klan in popular film. The Journal of Popular Culture, 32(4), 13–22. doi:10.1111/j.0022-3840.1999.00013.x
- Harcourt, F. (2014). Invisible umpires: The Ku Klux Klan and baseball in the 1920s. NINE: A Journal of Baseball History and Culture, 23(1), 1–16. doi:10.1353/nin.2014.0028
- Harcourt, F. (2017). Ku Klux kulture: America and the Klan in the 1920s. University of Chicago Press.
- Laackman, D. W. (2020). Selling hate: Marketing the Ku Klux Klan. University of Georgia Press.
- Rice, T. (2008a). Protecting Protestantism: The Ku Klux Klan vs. the motion picture industry. Film History, 20(3), 367–380. doi:10.2979/fil.2008.20.3.367
- Rice, T. (2008b). "The true story of the Ku Klux Klan": Defining the Klan through film. Journal of American Studies, 42(3), 471–488. doi:10.1017/s0021875808005537
- Rice, T. (2015). White robes, silver screens: Movies and the making of the Ku Klux Klan. Indiana University Press.

== See also ==
- Bibliography of the history of lynching
- Bibliography of slavery in the United States
- Enforcement Acts
- List of Ku Klux Klan organizations
- Lynching in the United States
- Reconstruction era
- The Birth of a Nation
- White supremacy
