= Communist Workers' Party (United States) =

Political party in United States (1973–85)

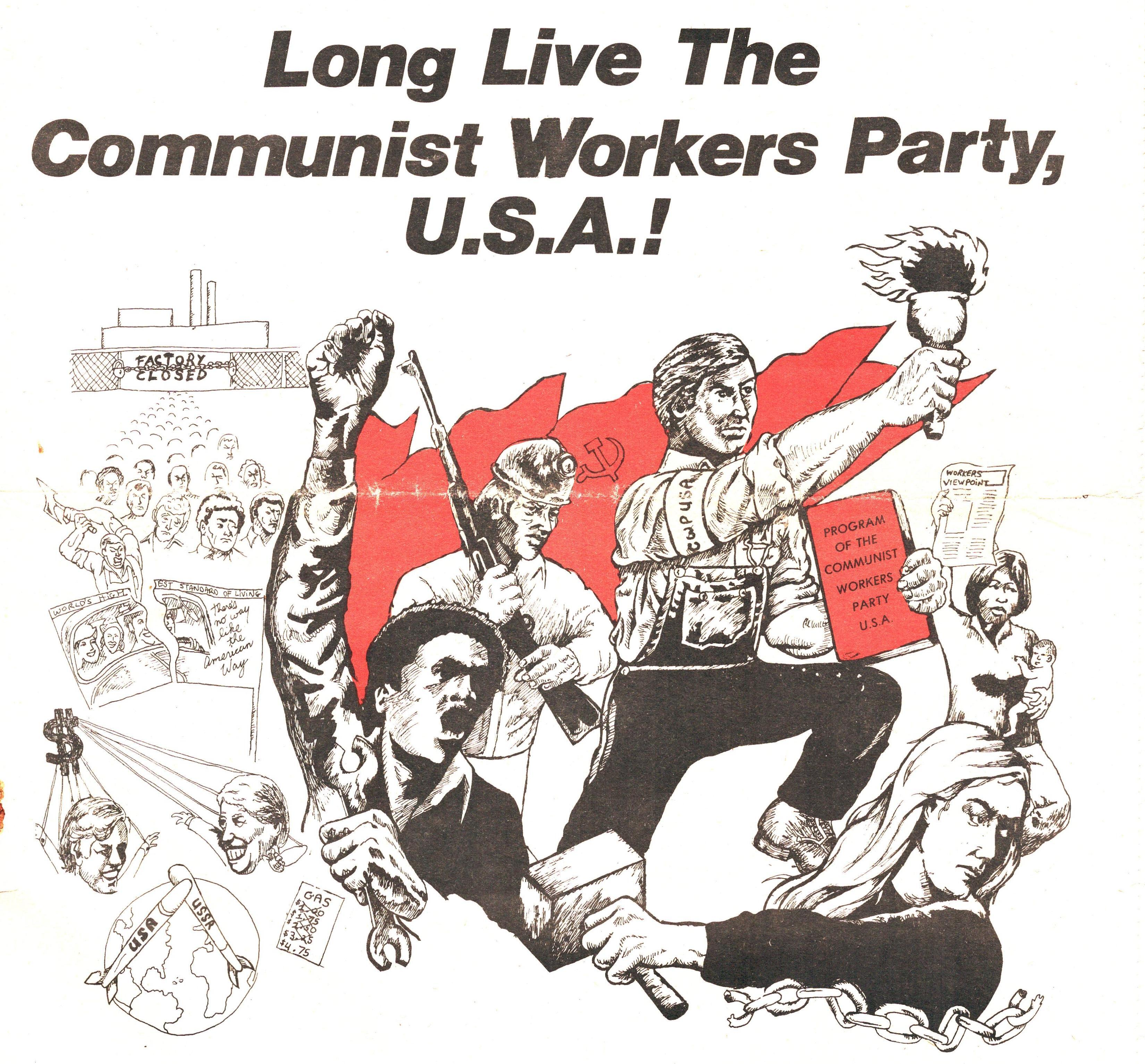
- Leader: Jerry Tung
- Founded: 1973; 53 years ago (as ASG)
- Dissolved: 1985; 41 years ago (as CWP)
- Youth wing: Revolutionary Youth League
- Ideology: New Communist movement Maoism; Democratic socialism (later)
- Political position: Far-left

The Communist Workers' Party (CWP), also known as the New Democratic Movement (NDM), was a far-left Maoist group in the United States. It had its origin in 1973 as the Asian Study Group (ASG, renamed the Workers' Viewpoint Organization in 1976) established by Jerry Tung, a former member of the Progressive Labor Party who had grown disenchanted with the group and disagreed with changes taking place in the party line. The party is mainly remembered as being associated with victims of the Greensboro massacre of 1979.

The CWP was part of the American New Communist movement and followed the policies of Mao Zedong. The CWP also incorporated aspects of the Communist Party USA's anti-racist pre-Popular Front program. In particular the CWP emphasized unionization and self-determination for African Americans.

== History ==
=== Origins and ideology ===
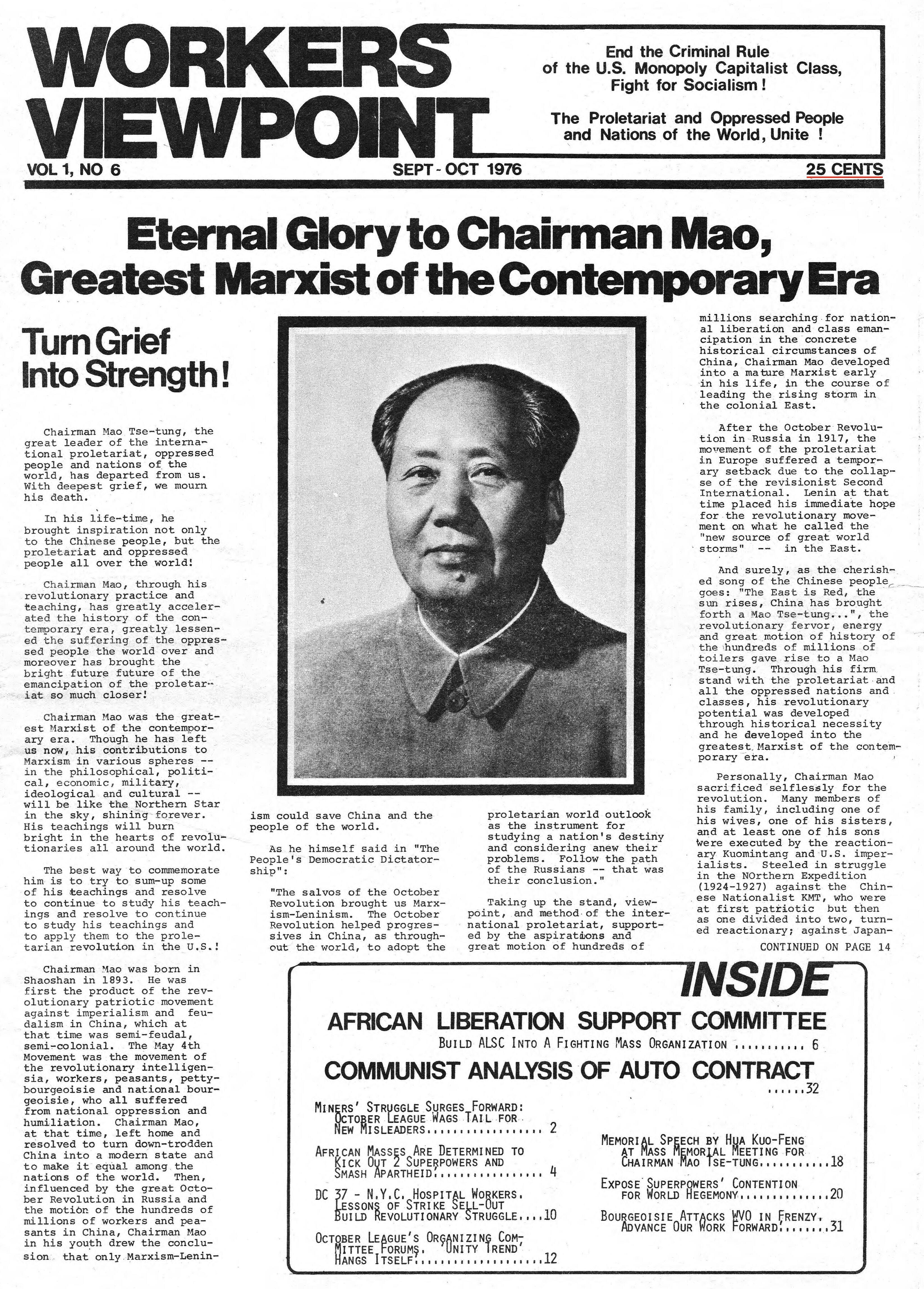
1976 Workers Viewpoint cover after the death of Mao Zedong

The Communist Workers' Party (CWP) enjoyed some success in textile cities of North Carolina. The party also established branches in New York, Boston, Los Angeles, the San Francisco Bay Area, Philadelphia, Chicago, Detroit, West Virginia, Colorado and other locations. Before forming itself into a party in October 1979 (the founding congress was held in the backroom of a discothèque in New York City), the group was known as the Asian Study Group and later the Workers' Viewpoint Organization. Under its umbrella, the party directed groups such as the Revolutionary Youth League, the African Liberation Support Committee, and the Trade Union Education League.

From its earliest phase as the Asian Study Group and the Workers' Viewpoint Organization, the CWP had considered itself as ideologically Maoist and supported the so-called Gang of Four after Mao Zedong's death. Its leader, Jerry Tung, was a Chinese American from New York and a staunch Maoist who had visited China on several occasions in the 1970s. Following the line of Mao, it considered the Soviet Union and its bloc as restored capitalist countries. For some time after the arrest of the Gang of Four, the group remained silent about the events in China but later accused China also of having taken the capitalist road. In 1980, there was a dramatic reversal of this line. In his book The Socialist Road, CWP Chairman Jerry Tung announced that both the Soviet Union and China were socialist, although an unhealthy bureaucracy had taken shape in the governments of both countries.

An article published in the Workers Viewpoint in 1976 criticized a social liberal and libertine view of sexuality as "the bourgeoisie’s attempts to dope us with degenerate culture and fascist ideology." The article opposed pornography as representing anti-woman American bourgeois hedonism (it singled out the film Snuff) and argued that homosexuality "is a form of social sickness, a form of social perversion. It is a form of bourgeois ideology which appeals especially to the petty bourgeoisie because of its appearance as sexual freedom."

=== 1979 Greensboro Massacre ===
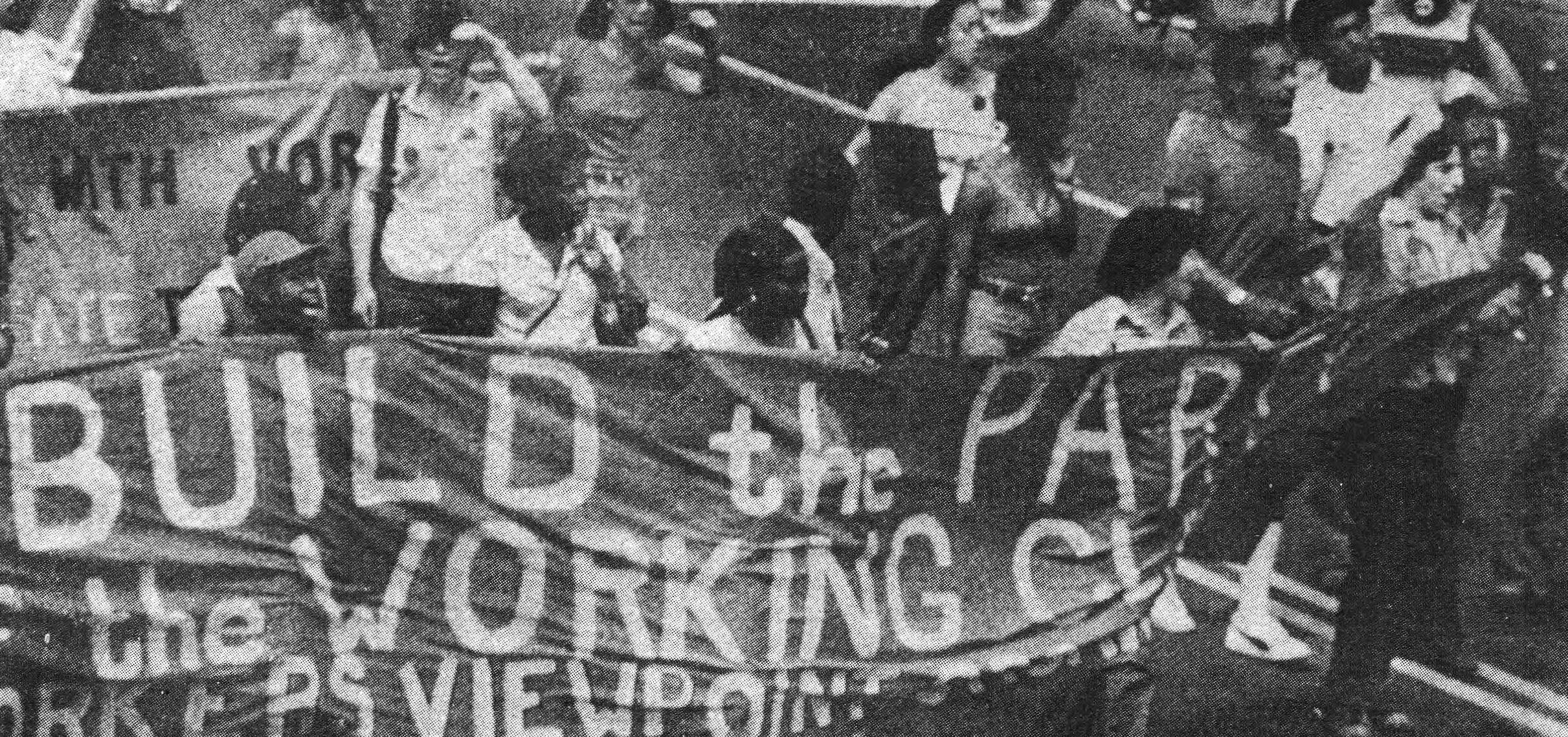
Workers Viewpoint banner at an African Liberation Day celebration

Confrontations with the Ku Klux Klan ("Klan" or "KKK") were particularly acute in Greensboro, North Carolina, where the Klan sought to disrupt the CWP's effort to unionize poor, black mill workers in the Greensboro area. In July 1979, the Klan held a rally and viewing of The Birth of a Nation in China Grove, near Charlotte, which was disrupted by CWP members who burned a Confederate flag and taunted members of the KKK. CWP leader Paul Bermanzohn taunted the Klan in the press, saying "The KKK is one of the most treacherous scum elements produced by the dying system of capitalism" and inviting further confrontation with "We challenge you to attend our rally in Greensboro."

On November 3, 1979, members of the KKK, including a police informant, and the National Socialist Party of America, a splinter of the American Nazi Party, drove up to the "Death to the Klan" rally organized by the CWP. The KKK were armed and opened fire on the anti-Klan rally, killing four members of the CWP and one non-affiliated participant. These deaths became known as the "Greensboro Massacre." Two subsequent trials of Klansmen and Nazis resulted in acquittals. In response to the acquittals of the accused killers, the CWP attempted to storm the 1980 Democratic National Convention and succeeded in setting off firecrackers in Madison Square Garden.

=== Demise ===
Subsequent to the Greensboro massacre, the group gave up its vanguardist structure and moved towards a democratic socialist and social democratic formation that would work for peaceful transition to socialism; it dissolved the Communist Workers' Party and formed the New Democratic Movement (NDM) in its place in 1985. NDM lasted only a few years. The most important remnant of the CWP/NDM can be found in the Greensboro Justice Fund, which continues to this day and promotes groups struggling for social justice.

== Publications ==
- Preliminary Draft on the Asian national question in America: Part 1, The Chinese National Question. n.c.: Asian Study Group, 1973.
- Build Marxist-Leninist Leadership of the Women's Movement: Women and Men Unite Against Sexism, Racism, and Imperialism. New York : Workers Viewpoint Organization, 1975.
- Eternal Glory to Chairman Mao, Greatest Marxist of the Contemporary Era New York: Workers Viewpoint Organization, 1976.
- The African Peoples' Struggle Will Surely Triumph!: Build the Communist Leadership of the African Liberation Support Committee!. New York: Workers Viewpoint Organization, 1977.
- Fight for the Real Emancipation of Women!: Smash the Double Yoke of Capitalism and Domestic Slavery = Luchen por la Verdadera Liberación de Mujeres!: Aplaste el Doble Yugo del Capitalismo y Esclavitud Domestica. New York: Workers Viewpoint Organization, 1977.
- Communists Should Be the Advanced Elements of the Proletariat. New York: Workers Viewpoint Organization, 1978.
- Whip Weber now! New York: Workers Viewpoint Organization, 1979.
- Turn the Country Upside Down to Beat Back the Renewed Wave of Attacks from the Capitalists' tools: KKK, Nazis, Pigs, and FBI. New York: Committee to Avenge the Murder of the Communist Workers Party (WV) 5, 1980.
- The Current Revolutionary Situation: Our Tasks. Phil Thompson New York: Communist Workers Party, 1980s.
- Jerry Tung, The Socialist Road: Character of Revolution in the U.S. and Problems of Socialism in the Soviet Union and China. New York: Cesar Cauce Publishers, 1981.
- The Afro-American National Question. New York: The Party, 1981.
- Scott Van Valkenburg, Central America: Communist Threat? New York: Communist Workers Party, 1984.

== See also ==
- New Left

== Archives ==
- Workers Viewpoint. New York, NY. Publisher: Communist Workers Party. 1983-1986. Box: 252a, current.
- Tamiment Library Boxed Newspapers Collection. 1873-, (Bulk 1960-1990).
