= Bibliography of the history of lynching =

Bibliography of lynching in the United States

Bibliography of lynching in the United States
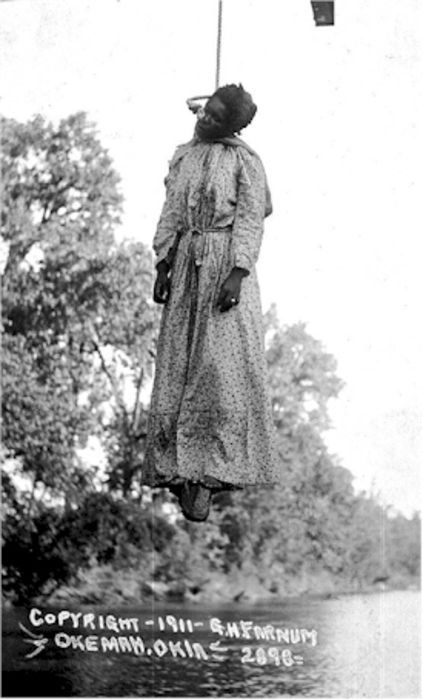
- The lynching of Laura Nelson in Okemah, Oklahoma, on May 25, 1911
- Subject: History of lynching and mob violence in the United States
- Chronological scope: Nineteenth and twentieth centuries
- Geographic scope: United States
- Language: English-language scholarship
- Arrangement: Thematic, by victim group
- Citation style: APA 7

This bibliography of lynching in the United States is limited to history and excludes other disciplines.

Lynching is a form of violence in which a mob, under the pretext of administering justice without trial, executes a presumed offender, often after inflicting torture. The term is probably derived from the name of Charles Lynch (1736–1796), who led an irregular court formed to punish loyalists during the American Revolutionary War. Records kept by the NAACP count 4,743 lynchings in the United States between 1882 and 1968; 3,446 of those killed were Black, and the remainder included white Americans and immigrants from Mexico, China, and other countries. The organization notes that there was no formal tracking and that the true number is probably higher. The Equal Justice Initiative has documented 4,075 racial terror lynchings in twelve Southern states between 1877 and 1950.

Bibliography contains academic level English language books (including translations) and journal articles, published mainly post World War II. (Note: Works published before World War II should be limited to areas where there is no significant post World War II books on the subject or when the work in question has significant historical merit.) Book entries may have references to reviews published in academic journals or major newspapers when these could be considered helpful. These reference reviews also function as a resource to find other works on this subject.

Works listed here are cited in the notes or bibliographies of scholarly sources. Each is published by an academic or major trade press, written by a recognized expert, or substantially reviewed in scholarly journals; borderline cases are omitted. A selection of primary sources are included. Many of the books below carry their own bibliographies; see Further reading section for longer ones, and External links section for historical sites and museums.

Citations follow APA style. (Note: Entries are in plain text APA 7 format without templates; templates are used only for reviews and notes.) Book have citations to academic journal or mainstream published reviews when available. For books only partly about the subject, give relevant chapter or section titles where useful and available. Translators of the original-language edition are included when possible. In cases where a title or name has appeared with more than one English spelling, use the most recent published form is used and a footnote documents any earlier title under which the work appeared.

== General surveys ==
- Apel, D., & Smith, S. M. (2008). Lynching photographs. University of California Press. doi:10.1525/9780520941250
- Arellano, L. (2012). Vigilantes and lynch mobs: Narratives of community and nation. Temple University Press.
- Bancroft, H. H. (1887). Popular tribunals (Vols. 1–2). The History Company.
- Berg, M. (2011). Popular justice: A history of lynching in America. Ivan R. Dee. doi:10.5040/9798216439189
- Berg, M., & Wendt, S. (Eds.). (2011). Globalizing lynching history: Vigilantism and extralegal punishment from an international perspective. Palgrave Macmillan. doi:10.1057/9781137001245
- Broussard, A. S. (2011). New perspectives on lynching, race riots, and mob violence. Journal of American Ethnic History, 30(3), 71–75. doi:10.5406/jamerethnhist.30.3.0071
- Carrigan, W. D. (2004). The making of a lynching culture: Violence and vigilantism in central Texas, 1836–1916. University of Illinois Press.
- Carrigan, W. D., & Waldrep, C. (Eds.). (2013). Swift to wrath: Lynching in global historical perspective. University of Virginia Press.
- Cutler, J. E. (1905). Lynch-law: An investigation into the history of lynching in the United States. Longmans, Green, and Co.
- Eaton, C. (1942). Mob violence in the Old South. The Mississippi Valley Historical Review, 29(3), 351–370. JSTOR 1897915
- Gorup, M. (2020). The strange fruit of the tree of liberty: Lynch law and popular sovereignty in the United States. Perspectives on Politics, 18(3), 819–834. doi:10.1017/s1537592720001255
- Kim, L. (2012). A law of unintended consequences: United States postal censorship of lynching photographs. Visual Resources, 28(2), 171–193. doi:10.1080/01973762.2012.678812
- Matthews, A. (1904). The term lynch law. Modern Philology, 2(2), 173–195. doi:10.1086/386635
- Pfeifer, M. J. (2004). Rough justice: Lynching and American society, 1874–1947. University of Illinois Press.
- Pfeifer, M. J. (2011). The roots of rough justice: Origins of American lynching. University of Illinois Press. doi:10.5406/illinois/9780252036132.001.0001
- Pfeifer, M. J. (Ed.). (2013). Lynching beyond Dixie: American mob violence outside the South. University of Illinois Press. doi:10.5406/illinois/9780252037467.001.0001
- Pfeifer, M. J. (Ed.). (2017). Global lynching and collective violence: Volume 2: The Americas and Europe. University of Illinois Press. doi:10.5406/j.ctt1vjqrpr
- Rushdy, A. H. A. (2012). American lynching. Yale University Press. doi:10.12987/yale/9780300181388.001.0001
- Segrave, K. (2010). Lynchings of women in the United States: The recorded cases, 1851–1946. McFarland & Company.
- Seguin, C., & Rigby, D. (2019). National crimes: A new national data set of lynchings in the United States, 1883 to 1941. Socius, 5. doi:10.1177/2378023119841780
- Shuler, J. (2014). The thirteenth turn: A history of the noose. PublicAffairs.
- Thurston, R. W. (2011). Lynching: American mob murder in global perspective. Ashgate.
- Tolnay, S. (2012). Quantitative narrative analysis—What it can and cannot tell us about lynching. Sociological Methodology, 42(1), 91–93. doi:10.1177/0081175012460855
- Waldrep, C. (2002). The many faces of Judge Lynch: Extralegal violence and punishment in America. Palgrave Macmillan. doi:10.1057/9781403982711
- Waldrep, C. (Ed.). (2006). Lynching in America: A history in documents. New York University Press.
- Yost, G. (1933). History of lynchings in Kansas. Kansas Historical Quarterly, 2(2), 182–219.

== African Americans ==
- Allen, J., Als, H., Lewis, J., & Litwack, L. F. (2000). Without sanctuary: Lynching photography in America. Twin Palms.
- Apel, D. (2004). Imagery of lynching: Black men, white women, and the mob. Rutgers University Press.
- Bailey, A. K., & Tolnay, S. E. (2015). Lynched: The victims of Southern mob violence. University of North Carolina Press. doi:10.5149/northcarolina/9781469620879.001.0001
- Baker, D. V., & Garcia, G. (2019). An analytical history of Black female lynchings in the United States, 1838–1969. Journal of Qualitative Criminal Justice & Criminology. doi:10.21428/88de04a1.105517eb
- Beck, E. M., Massey, J. L., & Tolnay, S. E. (1989). The gallows, the mob, and the vote: Lethal sanctioning of Blacks in North Carolina and Georgia, 1882 to 1930. Law & Society Review, 23(2), 317–331. JSTOR 3053720
- Beck, E. M., & Tolnay, S. E. (1990). The killing fields of the Deep South: The market for cotton and the lynching of Blacks, 1882–1930. American Sociological Review, 55(4), 526–539. JSTOR 2095805
- Brundage, W. F. (1993). Lynching in the New South: Georgia and Virginia, 1880–1930. University of Illinois Press.
- Brundage, W. F. (Ed.). (1997). Under sentence of death: Lynching in the South. University of North Carolina Press.
- Capeci, D. J., Jr. (1998). The lynching of Cleo Wright. University Press of Kentucky.
- Clarke, J. W. (1998). Without fear or shame: Lynching, capital punishment and the subculture of violence in the American South. British Journal of Political Science, 28(2), 269–289. doi:10.1017/S0007123498000167
- Cone, J. H. (2011). The cross and the lynching tree. Orbis Books.
- Corzine, J., Creech, J., & Corzine, L. (1983). Black concentration and lynchings in the South: Testing Blalock's power-threat hypothesis. Social Forces, 61(3), 774–796. doi:10.1093/sf/61.3.774
- Curriden, M., & Phillips, L., Jr. (1999). Contempt of court: The turn-of-the-century lynching that launched 100 years of federalism. Faber and Faber.
- Dray, P. (2002). At the hands of persons unknown: The lynching of Black America. Random House.
- Epperly, B., Witko, C., Strickler, R., & White, P. (2020). Rule by violence, rule by law: Lynching, Jim Crow, and the continuing evolution of voter suppression in the U.S. Perspectives on Politics, 18(3), 756–769. doi:10.1017/s1537592718003584
- Feimster, C. N. (2009). Southern horrors: Women and the politics of rape and lynching. Harvard University Press.
- Finnegan, T. (2013). A deed so accursed: Lynching in Mississippi and South Carolina, 1881–1940. University of Virginia Press.
- Francis, M. M. (2014). Civil rights and the making of the modern American state. Cambridge University Press. doi:10.1017/cbo9781139583749
- Garland, D. (2005). Penal excess and surplus meaning: Public torture lynchings in twentieth-century America. Law & Society Review, 39(4), 793–834. doi:10.1111/j.1540-5893.2005.00245.x
- Goldsby, J. (2006). A spectacular secret: Lynching in American life and literature. University of Chicago Press. doi:10.7208/chicago/9780226791982.001.0001
- Greene, T. J. (2004). Teaching the limits of liberalism in the interwar years: The NAACP's antilynching campaign. OAH Magazine of History, 18(2), 28–30. doi:10.1093/maghis/18.2.28
- Hagen, R., Makovi, K., & Bearman, P. (2013). The influence of political dynamics on southern lynch mob formation and lethality. Social Forces, 92(2), 757–787. doi:10.1093/sf/sot093
- Hill, K. K. (2010). Black vigilantism: The rise and decline of African American lynch mob activity in the Mississippi and Arkansas Deltas, 1883–1923. The Journal of African American History, 95(1), 26–43. doi:10.5323/jafriamerhist.95.1.0026
- Hill, K. K. (2016). Beyond the rope: The impact of lynching on Black culture and memory. Cambridge University Press. doi:10.1017/cbo9781107358539
- Holden-Smith, B. (1996). Lynching, federalism, and the intersection of race and gender in the Progressive Era. Yale Journal of Law and Feminism, 8(1).
- Ifill, S. A. (2007). On the courthouse lawn: Confronting the legacy of lynching in the twenty-first century. Beacon Press.
- Kato, D. (2015). Liberalizing lynching: Building a new racialized state. Oxford University Press. doi:10.1093/acprof:oso/9780190232573.001.0001
- Lightweis-Goff, J. (2011). Blood at the root: Lynching as American cultural nucleus. State University of New York Press. doi:10.1353/book2595
- Markovitz, J. (2004). Legacies of lynching: Racial violence and memory. University of Minnesota Press.
- McGovern, J. R. (1982). Anatomy of a lynching: The killing of Claude Neal. Louisiana State University Press.
- Messner, S. F., Baller, R. D., & Zevenbergen, M. P. (2005). The legacy of lynching and Southern homicide. American Sociological Review, 70(4), 633–655. doi:10.1177/000312240507000405
- Nevels, C. S. (2007). Lynching to belong: Claiming whiteness through racial violence. Texas A&M University Press.
- Ore, E. J. (2019). Lynching: Violence, rhetoric, and American identity. University Press of Mississippi. JSTOR j.ctvgs08j3
- Rable, G. C. (1985). The South and the politics of antilynching legislation, 1920–1940. The Journal of Southern History, 51(2), 201. JSTOR 2208825
- Raper, A. F. (1933). The tragedy of lynching. University of North Carolina Press.
- Rushdy, A. H. A. (2012). The end of American lynching. Rutgers University Press. doi:10.36019/9780813552934
- Scott, T. A. (2022). Lynching and leisure: Race and the transformation of mob violence in Texas. University of Arkansas Press. doi:10.1353/book100309
- Simien, E. M. (Ed.). (2011). Gender and lynching: The politics of memory. Palgrave Macmillan. doi:10.1057/9781137001221
- Smångs, M. (2016). Doing violence, making race: Southern lynching and white racial group formation. American Journal of Sociology, 121(5), 1329–1374. doi:10.1086/684438
- Smead, H. (1986). Blood justice: The lynching of Mack Charles Parker. Oxford University Press.
- Smith, T. E. (2007). The discourse of violence: Transatlantic narratives of lynching during high imperialism. Journal of Colonialism and Colonial History, 8(2). doi:10.1353/cch.2007.0040
- Testa, P. A., & Williams, J. (2026). Political foundations of racial violence in the post-Reconstruction South. The Quarterly Journal of Economics, 141(1), 733–794. doi:10.1093/qje/qjaf045
- Tolnay, S. E., & Beck, E. M. (1992). Racial violence and Black migration in the American South, 1910 to 1930. American Sociological Review, 57(1), 103–116. JSTOR 2096147
- Tolnay, S. E., & Beck, E. M. (1995). A festival of violence: An analysis of southern lynchings, 1882–1930. University of Illinois Press.
- Vandiver, M. (2006). Lethal punishment: Lynchings and legal executions in the South. Rutgers University Press. doi:10.36019/9780813541068
- Waldrep, C. (2009). African Americans confront lynching: Strategies of resistance from the Civil War to the civil rights era. Rowman & Littlefield.
- Wexler, L. (2003). Fire in a canebrake: The last mass lynching in America. Scribner.
- Williams, K. E. (2012). They left great marks on me: African American testimonies of racial violence from emancipation to World War I. New York University Press. doi:10.18574/nyu/9780814795378.001.0001
- Wood, A. L. (2009). Lynching and spectacle: Witnessing racial violence in America, 1890–1940. University of North Carolina Press. doi:10.5149/9780807878118_wood
- Wright, G. C. (1990). Racial violence in Kentucky, 1865–1940: Lynchings, mob rule, and "legal lynchings". Louisiana State University Press.
- Zangrando, R. L. (1980). The NAACP crusade against lynching, 1909–1950. Temple University Press.

=== Laura and L. D. Nelson ===
- Allen, J., Als, H., Lewis, J., & Litwack, L. F. (2000). Without sanctuary: Lynching photography in America. Twin Palms.
- Archer, S. (2006). Reading the riot acts. Southwest Review, 91(4), 500–516.
- Cray, E. (2004). Ramblin' man: The life and times of Woody Guthrie. W. W. Norton.
- Kaufman, W. (2011). Woody Guthrie, American radical. University of Illinois Press.
- Lightweis-Goff, J. (2011). The lynched woman: Kara Walker, Laura Nelson, and the question of agency. In Blood at the root: Lynching as American cultural nucleus (pp. 113–144). State University of New York Press. doi:10.1353/book2595

=== James Byrd Jr. ===
- Ainslie, R. C. (2004). Long dark road: Bill King and murder in Jasper, Texas. University of Texas Press. doi:10.7560/705746
- Ainslie, R. C., & Brabeck, K. (2003). Race murder and community trauma: Psychoanalysis and ethnography in exploring the impact of the killing of James Byrd in Jasper, Texas. Journal for the Psychoanalysis of Culture and Society, 8(1), 42–50. doi:10.1353/psy.2003.0002
- Glascock, J. (2004). The Jasper dragging death: Crisis communication and the community newspaper. Communication Studies, 55(1), 29–47. doi:10.1080/10510970409388604
- King, J. (2002). Hate crime: The story of a dragging in Jasper, Texas. Pantheon.
- Temple-Raston, D. (2002). A death in Texas: A story of race, murder, and a small town's struggle for redemption. Henry Holt.
- Wicke, T., & Silver, R. C. (2009). A community responds to collective trauma: An ecological analysis of the James Byrd murder in Jasper, Texas. American Journal of Community Psychology, 44(3–4), 233–248. doi:10.1007/s10464-009-9262-8

=== Emmett Till ===
- Anderson, D. S. (2015). Emmett Till: The murder that shocked the world and propelled the civil rights movement. University Press of Mississippi.
- Breed, W. (1958). Comparative newspaper handling of the Emmett Till case. Journalism Quarterly, 35(3), 291–298. doi:10.1177/107769905803500302
- Eagles, C. W. (2026). Emmett Till and his interpreters. Journal of Southern History, 92(2), 295–334. doi:10.1353/soh.2026.a989774
- Gorn, E. (2015). Unquiet Emmett Till. Southern Spaces. doi:10.18737/m79k53
- Gorn, E. J. (2018). Let the people see: The story of Emmett Till. Oxford University Press.
- Harold, C., & DeLuca, K. M. (2005). Behold the corpse: Violent images and the case of Emmett Till. Rhetoric & Public Affairs, 8(2), 263–286. doi:10.1353/rap.2005.0075
- Houck, D. W. (2005). Killing Emmett. Rhetoric & Public Affairs, 8(2), 225–262. doi:10.1353/rap.2005.0078
- Houck, D. W., & Grindy, M. A. (2008). Emmett Till and the Mississippi press. University Press of Mississippi. doi:10.14325/mississippi/9781934110157.001.0001
- Kolin, P. C. (2009). Haunting America: Emmett Till in music and song. Southern Cultures, 15(3), 115–138. doi:10.1353/scu.0.0072
- Mace, D. (2014). In remembrance of Emmett Till: Regional stories and media responses to the Black freedom struggle. University Press of Kentucky. doi:10.5810/kentucky/9780813145365.001.0001
- Metress, C. (Ed.). (2002). The lynching of Emmett Till: A documentary narrative. University of Virginia Press.
- Metress, C. (2003). "No justice, no peace": The figure of Emmett Till in African American literature. MELUS, 28(1), 87–103. JSTOR 3595247
- Pollack, H., & Metress, C. (Eds.). (2008). Emmett Till in literary memory and imagination. Louisiana State University Press.
- Priest, M. (2010). "The nightmare is not cured": Emmett Till and American healing. American Quarterly, 62(1), 1–24. doi:10.1353/aq.0.0120
- Rubin, A. S. (1995). Reflections on the death of Emmett Till. Southern Cultures, 2(1), 45–66. doi:10.1353/scu.1995.0000
- Smith, S. M. (2015). The afterimages of Emmett Till. American Art, 29(1), 22–27. doi:10.1086/681653
- Tell, D. (2008). The "shocking story" of Emmett Till and the politics of public confession. Quarterly Journal of Speech, 94(2), 156–178. doi:10.1080/00335630801975426
- Tell, D. (2017). Remembering Emmett Till: Reflections on geography, race, and memory. Advances in the History of Rhetoric, 20(2), 121–138. doi:10.1080/15362426.2017.1325414
- Tell, D. (2019). Remembering Emmett Till. University of Chicago Press. doi:10.7208/chicago/9780226559704.001.0001
- Till-Mobley, M., & Benson, C. (2003). Death of innocence: The story of the hate crime that changed America. Random House.
- Tyson, T. B. (2017). The blood of Emmett Till. Simon & Schuster.
- Whitaker, H. S. (2005). A case study in Southern justice: The murder and trial of Emmett Till. Rhetoric & Public Affairs, 8(2), 189–224. doi:10.1353/rap.2005.0080
- Whitfield, S. J. (1988). A death in the Delta: The story of Emmett Till. Free Press.

=== Sam Hose ===
- Arnold, E. T. (2009). "What virtue there is in fire": Cultural memory and the lynching of Sam Hose. University of Georgia Press. doi:10.1353/book11925

=== Zachariah Walker ===
- Downey, D. B., & Hyser, R. M. (1991). No crooked death: Coatesville, Pennsylvania, and the lynching of Zachariah Walker. University of Illinois Press.

=== Jesse Washington ===
- Bernstein, P. (2005). The first Waco horror: The lynching of Jesse Washington and the rise of the NAACP. Texas A&M University Press.
- SoRelle, J. M. (1983). The "Waco horror": The lynching of Jesse Washington. The Southwestern Historical Quarterly, 86(4), 517–536.

=== Mary Turner ===
- Armstrong, J. B. (2011a). Mary Turner and the memory of lynching. University of Georgia Press.
- Armstrong, J. B. (2011b). Mary Turner, hidden memory, and narrative possibility. In E. M. Simien (Ed.), Gender and lynching: The politics of memory (pp. 15–35). Palgrave Macmillan. doi:10.1057/9781137001221_2
- Meyers, C. C. (2006). "Killing them by the wholesale": A lynching rampage in South Georgia. The Georgia Historical Quarterly, 90(2), 214–235. JSTOR 40584910

=== Duluth lynchings ===
- Fedo, M. (2000). The lynchings in Duluth. Minnesota Historical Society Press.

=== Tulsa race massacre ===
- Brophy, A. L. (2002). Reconstructing the dreamland: The Tulsa riot of 1921: Race, reparations, and reconciliation. Oxford University Press.
- Ellsworth, S. (1982). Death in a promised land: The Tulsa race riot of 1921. Louisiana State University Press.
- Greenwood, R. M. (2015). Remembrance, responsibility, and reparations: The use of emotions in talk about the 1921 Tulsa race riot. Journal of Social Issues, 71(2), 338–355. doi:10.1111/josi.12114
- Hill, K. K. (2021a). Community-engaged history: A reflection on the 100th anniversary of the 1921 Tulsa race massacre. The American Historical Review, 126(2), 670–684. doi:10.1093/ahr/rhab193
- Hill, K. K. (2021b). The 1921 Tulsa race massacre: A photographic history. University of Oklahoma Press.
- Hirsch, J. S. (2002). Riot and remembrance: The Tulsa race war and its legacy. Houghton Mifflin.
- Karatzas, K. D. (2018). Interpreting violence: The 1921 Tulsa race riot and its legacy. European Journal of American Culture, 37(2), 127–140. doi:10.1386/ejac.37.2.127_1
- Krehbiel, R. (2019). Tulsa, 1921: Reporting a massacre. University of Oklahoma Press.
- Madigan, T. (2001). The burning: Massacre, destruction, and the Tulsa race riot of 1921. Thomas Dunne Books.
- Messer, C. M. (2011). The Tulsa race riot of 1921: Toward an integrative theory of collective violence. Journal of Social History, 44(4), 1217–1232. doi:10.1353/jsh.2011.0053
- Messer, C. M. (2021). The 1921 Tulsa race massacre: Crafting a legacy. Palgrave Macmillan. doi:10.1007/978-3-030-74679-7
- Messer, C. M., Shriver, T. E., & Beamon, K. K. (2017). Official frames and the Tulsa race riot of 1921: The struggle for reparations. Sociology of Race and Ethnicity, 4(3), 386–399. doi:10.1177/2332649217742414
- Witten, A., Brooks, R., & Fenner, T. (2001). The Tulsa race riot of 1921: A geophysical study to locate a mass grave. The Leading Edge, 20(6), 655–660. doi:10.1190/1.1439020

=== Thomas Shipp and Abram Smith ===
- Carr, C. (2006). Our town: A heartland lynching, a haunted town, and the hidden history of white America. Crown.
- Madison, J. H. (2001). A lynching in the heartland: Race and memory in America. Palgrave. doi:10.1007/978-1-137-05393-0

=== Willie Earle ===
- Gravely, W. B. (2019). They stole him out of jail: Willie Earle, South Carolina's last lynching victim. University of South Carolina Press. JSTOR j.ctv7r417g

== Asian Americans ==
- Karlin, J. A. (1954). The anti-Chinese outbreak in Tacoma, 1885. Pacific Historical Review, 23(3), 271–283. JSTOR 3635568
- Lew-Williams, B. (2014). Before restriction became exclusion: America's experiment in diplomatic immigration control. Pacific Historical Review, 83(1), 24–56. doi:10.1525/phr.2014.83.1.24
- Lew-Williams, B. (2018). The Chinese must go: Violence, exclusion, and the making of the alien in America. Harvard University Press. doi:10.4159/9780674919907
- Nokes, R. G. (2009). Massacred for gold: The Chinese in Hells Canyon. Oregon State University Press. doi:10.1353/book7317
- Pfaelzer, J. (2007). Driven out: The forgotten war against Chinese Americans. Random House.
- Storti, C. (1991). Incident at Bitter Creek: The story of the Rock Springs Chinese massacre. Iowa State University Press.
- Wunder, J. R. (1986). Chinese in trouble: Criminal law and race on the Trans-Mississippi West frontier. The Western Historical Quarterly, 17(1), 25. JSTOR 968644

=== Los Angeles Chinese massacre of 1871 ===
- De Falla, P. M. (1960a). Lantern in the western sky. The Historical Society of Southern California Quarterly, 42(1), 57–88. JSTOR 41169431
- De Falla, P. M. (1960b). Lantern in the western sky: Part II. The Historical Society of Southern California Quarterly, 42(2), 161–185. JSTOR 41169448
- Dorland, C. P. (1894). Chinese massacre at Los Angeles in 1871. Annual Publication of the Historical Society of Southern California, Los Angeles, 3(2), 22–26. JSTOR 41167579
- Estrada, W. D. (2008). The Los Angeles Plaza: Sacred and contested space. University of Texas Press. doi:10.7560/717541
- Faragher, J. M. (2016). Eternity street: Violence and justice in frontier Los Angeles. W. W. Norton.
- Gonzales-Day, K. (2006). Lynching in the West: 1850–1935. Duke University Press. doi:10.1215/9780822388241
- Jew, V. (2010). The anti-Chinese massacre of 1871 and its strange career. In W. Deverell & G. Hise (Eds.), A companion to Los Angeles (pp. 110–128). Wiley. doi:10.1002/9781444390964.ch7
- Locklear, W. R. (1960). The celestials and the angels: A study of the anti-Chinese movement in Los Angeles to 1882. The Historical Society of Southern California Quarterly, 42(3), 239–256. JSTOR 41169465
- Spitzzeri, P. R. (2005). Judge Lynch in session: Popular justice in Los Angeles, 1850–1875. Southern California Quarterly, 87(2), 83–122. JSTOR 41172258
- Torres-Rouff, D. S. (2013). Before L.A.: Race, space, and municipal power in Los Angeles, 1781–1894. Yale University Press. doi:10.12987/yale/9780300141238.001.0001
- Wallace, K. (2017, May 19). Forgotten Los Angeles history: The Chinese massacre of 1871. Los Angeles Public Library.
- Zesch, S. (2008). Chinese Los Angeles in 1870–1871: The makings of a massacre. Southern California Quarterly, 90(2), 109–158. JSTOR 41172418
- Zesch, S. (2012). The Chinatown war: Chinese Los Angeles and the massacre of 1871. Oxford University Press. doi:10.1093/acprof:osobl/9780199758760.001.0001

=== Rock Springs massacre ===
- Laurie, C. D. (1990). Civil disorder and the military in Rock Springs, Wyoming: The Army's role in the 1885 Chinese massacre. Montana: The Magazine of Western History, 40(3), 44–59.
- Lew-Williams, B. (2018). The Chinese must go: Violence, exclusion, and the making of the alien in America. Harvard University Press. doi:10.4159/9780674919907
- Memorial of Chinese laborers at Rock Springs, Wyoming (1885). (2006). In J. Yung, G. Chang, & H. M. Lai (Eds.), Chinese American voices: From the gold rush to the present (pp. 48–54). University of California Press.
- Shumate, R. (2017). Riot, race, and placing blame: Press coverage of the 1885 Rock Springs Chinese massacre. In D. B. Sachsman (Ed.), After the war: The press in a changing America, 1865–1900 (pp. 221–234). Routledge. doi:10.4324/9781351295086-17
- Storti, C. (1991). Incident at Bitter Creek: The story of the Rock Springs Chinese massacre. Iowa State University Press.

=== Chinese Massacre Cove ===
- Chung, S. F. (2011). Onward to Eastern Oregon. In In pursuit of gold: Chinese American miners and merchants in the American West (pp. 46–81). University of Illinois Press.
- Lopez, B. (2010). A dark light in the West: Racism and reconciliation. The Georgia Review, 64(3), 365–386.
- Nokes, R. G. (2006). "A most daring outrage": Murders at Chinese Massacre Cove, 1887. Oregon Historical Quarterly, 107(3), 326–353.
- Nokes, R. G. (2009). Massacred for gold: The Chinese in Hells Canyon. Oregon State University Press. doi:10.1353/book7317
- Nokes, R. G. (2013). Remembering Chinese in Hells Canyon and the Pacific Northwest. Oregon Historical Quarterly, 114(3), 365–369.

== White Americans ==
- Campney, B. M. S. (2020). State studies and the whiteness of white-on-white lynching. The Journal of the Gilded Age and Progressive Era, 20(1), 104–113. doi:10.1017/s1537781420000523
- Dinnerstein, L. (1968). The Leo Frank case. Columbia University Press. doi:10.7312/dinn93724
- Gambino, R. (1977). Vendetta: A true story of the worst lynching in America, the mass murder of Italian-Americans in New Orleans in 1891, the vicious motivations behind it, and the tragic repercussions that linger to this day. Doubleday.
- MacLean, N. (1991). The Leo Frank case reconsidered: Gender and sexual politics in the making of reactionary populism. The Journal of American History, 78(3), 917. JSTOR 2078796
- Oney, S. (2003). And the dead shall rise: The murder of Mary Phagan and the lynching of Leo Frank. Pantheon Books.
- Rigby, D., & Seguin, C. (2018). The racial position of European immigrants 1883–1941: Evidence from lynching in the Midwest. Social Currents, 5(5), 438–457. doi:10.1177/2329496518780921
- Seguin, C., & Nardin, S. (2022). The lynching of Italians and the rise of antilynching politics in the United States. Social Science History, 46(1), 65–91. doi:10.1017/ssh.2021.43
- Smith, T. (2007). The Crescent City lynchings: The murder of Chief Hennessy, the New Orleans "Mafia" trials, and the Parish Prison mob. Lyons Press.
- Webb, C. (2002). The lynching of Sicilian immigrants in the American South, 1886–1910. American Nineteenth Century History, 3(1), 45–76. doi:10.1080/713998981

== Native Americans ==
- Baker, D. V. (2007). American Indian executions in historical context. Criminal Justice Studies, 20(4), 315–373. doi:10.1080/14786010701758138
- Benavides, J. L. (2006). "Californios! Whom do you support?" El Clamor Público's contradictory role in the racial formation process in early California. California History, 84(2), 54–66. JSTOR 25161876
- Carlson, K. T. (1996). The lynching of Louie Sam. BC Studies, (109), 63–79. doi:10.14288/bcs.v0i109.1309
- Gonzales-Day, K. (2006). Lynching in the West: 1850–1935. Duke University Press. doi:10.1215/9780822388241
- Heizer, R. F. (Ed.). (1974). The destruction of California Indians: A collection of documents from the period 1847 to 1865 in which are described some of the things that happened to some of the Indians of California. Peregrine Smith.
- Hilleary, C. (2018, April 25). Remembering Native American lynching victims. Voice of America.
- Hurtado, A. L. (1988). Indian survival on the California frontier. Yale University Press.
- Jacoby, K. (2008). Shadows at dawn: A borderlands massacre and the violence of history. Penguin.
- Lindsay, B. C. (2012). Murder state: California's Native American genocide, 1846–1873. University of Nebraska Press. JSTOR j.ctt1d9nqs3
- Littlefield, D. F., Jr. (1996). Seminole burning: A story of racial vengeance. University Press of Mississippi.
- Madley, B. (2008). California's Yuki Indians: Defining genocide in Native American history. Western Historical Quarterly, 39(3), 303–332. doi:10.1093/whq/39.3.303
- Madley, B. (2016). An American genocide: The United States and the California Indian catastrophe, 1846–1873. Yale University Press.
- Madley, B. (2016). Understanding genocide in California under United States rule, 1846–1873. The Western Historical Quarterly, 47(4), 449–461. doi:10.1093/whq/whw176
- McKanna, C. V. (2004). Enclaves of violence in nineteenth-century California. Pacific Historical Review, 73(3), 391–424. doi:10.1525/phr.2004.73.3.391
- McLure, H. (2013). "Who dares to style this female a woman?": Lynching, gender, and culture in the nineteenth-century U.S. West. In M. J. Pfeifer (Ed.), Lynching beyond Dixie: American mob violence outside the South (pp. 21–53). University of Illinois Press. doi:10.5406/illinois/9780252037467.003.0001
- Pfeifer, M. J. (2011). The roots of rough justice: Origins of American lynching. University of Illinois Press. doi:10.5406/illinois/9780252036132.001.0001
- Pfeifer, M. J. (2021). Daniel F. Littlefield Jr.'s Seminole burning and the historiography of the lynching of Native Americans. The Journal of the Gilded Age and Progressive Era, 20(1), 81–86. doi:10.1017/S1537781420000493
- Pfeifer, M. J. (Ed.). (2013). Lynching beyond Dixie: American mob violence outside the South. University of Illinois Press. doi:10.5406/illinois/9780252037467.001.0001
- Spitzzeri, P. R. (2005). Judge Lynch in session: Popular justice in Los Angeles, 1850–1875. Southern California Quarterly, 87(2), 83–122. JSTOR 41172258

== Mexicans and Mexican Americans ==
- Behnken, B. D. (2022). Borders of violence and justice: Mexicans, Mexican Americans, and law enforcement in the Southwest, 1835–1935. University of North Carolina Press. doi:10.5149/northcarolina/9781469670126.001.0001
- Carrigan, W. D., & Webb, C. (2003). The lynching of persons of Mexican origin or descent in the United States, 1848 to 1928. Journal of Social History, 37(2), 411–438. doi:10.1353/jsh.2003.0169
- Carrigan, W. D., & Webb, C. (2013). Forgotten dead: Mob violence against Mexicans in the United States, 1848–1928. Oxford University Press.
- Delgado, R. (2009). The law of the noose: A history of Latino lynching. Harvard Civil Rights-Civil Liberties Law Review, 44, 297–312.
- Gonzales-Day, K. (2006). Lynching in the West: 1850–1935. Duke University Press. doi:10.1215/9780822388241
- Martinez, M. M. (2014). Recuperating histories of violence in the Americas: Vernacular history-making on the US-Mexico border. American Quarterly, 66(3), 661–689. doi:10.1353/aq.2014.0040
- Pitt, L. (1966). The decline of the Californios: A social history of the Spanish-speaking Californians, 1846–1890. University of California Press.
- Rosales, F. A. (1999). ¡Pobre raza! Violence, justice, and mobilization among México Lindo immigrants, 1900–1936. University of Texas Press. doi:10.7560/770942
- Villanueva, N., Jr. (2017). The lynching of Mexicans in the Texas borderlands. University of New Mexico Press.

== LGBT lynchings ==
- Green, D. P., Glaser, J., & Rich, A. (1998). From lynching to gay bashing: The elusive connection between economic conditions and hate crime. Journal of Personality and Social Psychology, 75, 82–92.
- Mitchell, K. (2013). Love in action: Noting similarities between lynching then and anti-LGBT violence now. Callaloo, 36(3), 688–717. doi:10.1353/cal.2013.0167

=== Matthew Shepard ===
- Jimenez, S. (2013). The book of Matt: Hidden truths about the murder of Matthew Shepard. Steerforth Press.
- Loffreda, B. (2000). Losing Matt Shepard: Life and politics in the aftermath of anti-gay murder. Columbia University Press.
- O'Donnell, M. (2009). Gay-hate, journalism and compassionate questioning: Journalism's response to the Matthew Shepard case. Asia Pacific Media Educator, 19, 112–125.
- Ott, B. L., & Aoki, E. (2002). The politics of negotiating public tragedy: Media framing of the Matthew Shepard murder. Rhetoric & Public Affairs, 5(3), 483–505. doi:10.1353/rap.2002.0060
- Shepard, J. (2009). The meaning of Matthew: My son's murder in Laramie, and a world transformed. Hudson Street Press.

== Anti-lynching advocates ==
- Brown, M. J. (2000). Eradicating this evil: Women in the American anti-lynching movement, 1892–1940. Garland.
- Brown, M. J. (2003). Advocates in the age of jazz: Women and the campaign for the Dyer Anti-Lynching Bill. Peace & Change, 28(3), 378–419. doi:10.1111/1468-0130.00268
- Cooper, M. (2017). Reframing Eleanor Roosevelt's influence in the 1930s anti-lynching movement around a "new philosophy of government". European Journal of American Studies, 12(1). doi:10.4000/ejas.11914
- Hall, J. D. (1979). Revolt against chivalry: Jessie Daniel Ames and the women's campaign against lynching. Columbia University Press.
- Hixson, W. B., Jr. (1969). Moorfield Storey and the defense of the Dyer Anti-Lynching Bill. The New England Quarterly, 42(1), 65–81. JSTOR 363500
- Janken, K. R. (2003). White: The biography of Walter White, Mr. NAACP. New Press.
- Levy, E. (1973). James Weldon Johnson: Black leader, Black voice. University of Chicago Press.
- White, W. (2002). Rope and faggot: A biography of Judge Lynch. University of Notre Dame Press. JSTOR j.ctvpj77g0 (Original work published 1929)

=== Ida B. Wells ===
- Giddings, P. J. (2008). Ida: A sword among lions: Ida B. Wells and the campaign against lynching. Amistad.
- Royster, J. J. (Ed.). (1997). Southern horrors and other writings: The anti-lynching campaign of Ida B. Wells, 1892–1900. Bedford Books.
- Silkey, S. L. (2015). Black woman reformer: Ida B. Wells, lynching, and transatlantic activism. University of Georgia Press. doi:10.1353/book38266

== Texas Rangers ==
- Harris, C. H., III, & Sadler, L. R. (2004). The Texas Rangers and the Mexican Revolution: The bloodiest decade, 1910–1920. University of New Mexico Press.
- Johnson, B. H. (2003). Revolution in Texas: How a forgotten rebellion and its bloody suppression turned Mexicans into Americans. Yale University Press.
- Levario, M. A. (2012). Militarizing the border: When Mexicans became the enemy. Texas A&M University Press.
- Martinez, M. M. (2018). The injustice never leaves you: Anti-Mexican violence in Texas. Harvard University Press. doi:10.4159/9780674989405
- Samora, J., Bernal, J., & Peña, A. (1979). Gunpowder justice: A reassessment of the Texas Rangers. University of Notre Dame Press.
- Utley, R. M. (2002). Lone star justice: The first century of the Texas Rangers. Oxford University Press.

== See also ==
- A man was lynched yesterday flag
- Anti-lynching movement
- Bibliography of the history of capital punishment
- Capital punishment in the United States
- Dyer Anti-Lynching Bill
- Emmett Till Antilynching Act
- Ku Klux Klan
- List of lynching victims in the United States
- Lynching in the United States
- Mass racial violence in the United States
- National Conference on Lynching
- National Memorial for Peace and Justice
