= Antifa (Germany) =

Anti-fascist movement in Germany

Antifa (German pronunciation: [ˈantifa]) is a political movement in Germany composed of multiple militant groups and individuals on the political left, who describe themselves as anti-fascist; its primary activity has been combating fascism: initially Nazism, and later neo-Nazism. The antifa movement in Germany has existed in different eras and incarnations, dating back to Antifaschistische Aktion, from which the moniker antifa came.

Antifaschistische Aktion was set up by the then-Stalinist Communist Party of Germany (KPD) during the late history of the Weimar Republic. After the forced dissolution in the wake of Machtergreifung ('power seizure') in 1933, the movement went underground. In the postwar era, Antifaschistische Aktion inspired a variety of different autonomous movements, groups and individuals in Germany as well as other countries which widely adopted variants of its aesthetics and some of its tactics.

Known as the wider antifa movement, the contemporary antifa groups have no direct organisational connection to Antifaschistische Aktion. The contemporary antifa movement has its roots in the West German Außerparlamentarische Opposition left-wing student movement and largely adopted the aesthetics of the first movement while being ideologically somewhat dissimilar. The first antifa groups in this tradition were founded by the Maoist Communist League in the early 1970s. From the late 1980s, West Germany's squatter scene and left-wing autonomism movement were the main contributors to the new antifa movement and in contrast to the earlier movement had a more anarcho-communist leaning. The contemporary movement has splintered into different groups and factions, including one anti-imperialist and anti-Zionist faction and one anti-German faction who strongly oppose each other, mainly over their views on Israel.

German government institutions such as the Federal Office for the Protection of the Constitution and the Federal Agency for Civic Education describe the contemporary antifa movement as part of the extreme left and as partially violent. Antifa groups are monitored by the federal office in the context of its legal mandate to combat extremism. The federal office states that the underlying goal of the antifa movement is "the struggle against the liberal democratic basic order" and capitalism. In the 1980s, the movement was accused by German authorities of engaging in terrorist acts of violence. According to these agencies, the use of the epithet fascist against opponents and the view of capitalism as a form of fascism are central to the movement.

== Antifaschistische Aktion ==
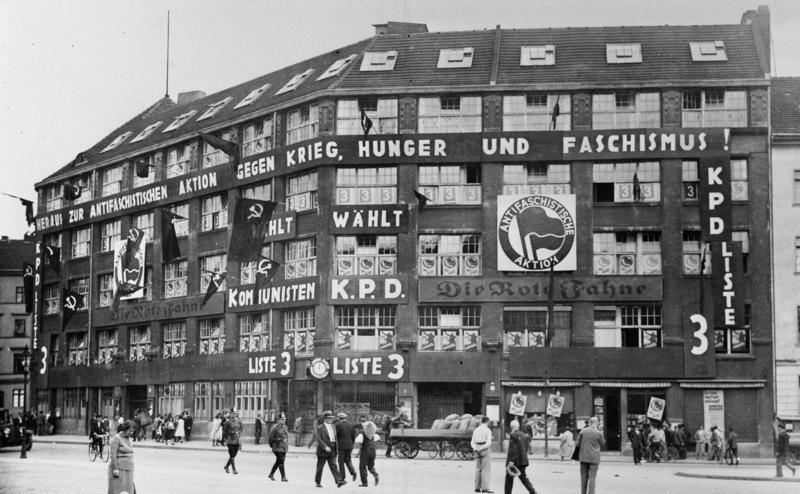
The Karl-Liebknecht-Haus in 1932, the historical seat of the Communist Party of Germany and Antifaschistische Aktion, with prominently displayed its logo

Antifaschistische Aktion was established by the Communist Party of Germany (KPD) based on the principle of a communist front and its establishment was announced in the party's newspaper Die Rote Fahne (The Red Flag) in 1932. It functioned as an integral part of the KPD during its entire existence from 1932 to 1933. A member of the Comintern, the KPD under the leadership of Ernst Thälmann was loyal to the Soviet government headed by Joseph Stalin to the extent that the party had been directly controlled and funded by the Soviet leadership in Moscow since 1928. The KPD described Antifaschistische Aktion as a "red united front under the leadership of the only anti-fascist party, the KPD".

During the Comintern's Third Period (1928–1931), the Social Democratic Party of Germany (SPD) was included by the KPD in the category of "fascists" based on the theory of "social fascism" supported by the Comintern in the early 1930s, according to which social democracy was a variant of fascism and even more dangerous and insidious than open fascism. The KPD doctrine held that the communist party was "the only anti-fascist party" while all other parties were "fascist".

The KPD in the Third Period did not view fascism as a specific political movement, but primarily as the final stage of capitalism and the KPD's anti-fascism was therefore synonymous with anti-capitalism. Throughout this period, the KPD regarded the centre-left SPD as its main adversary.

Consequently, anti-fascism and anti-fascist action in the language of the Third Period KPD also included the struggle against the social democrats. In the early 1930s, the KPD had stated that "fighting fascism means fighting the SPD just as much as it means fighting Hitler and the parties of Brüning". While some KPD members initially believed Antifaschistische Aktion should include other leftists, this opinion was quickly suppressed by the KPD leadership which made it clear that Antifaschistische Aktion would also oppose the SPD and that "Anti-Fascist Action means untiring daily exposure of the shameless, treacherous role of the SPD and ADGB leaders who are the direct filthy helpers of fascism".

Occasionally between late 1931 and late 1932, the KPD cooperated with the Nazis in attacking the SPD. In 1931, the KPD under the leadership of Ernst Thälmann internally used the slogan "After Hitler, our turn!", strongly believing that a united front against Nazis was not needed and that a Nazi dictatorship would ultimately crumble due to flawed economic policies and lead the KPD to power in Germany when the people realized that their economic policies were superior.

The relationship between the KPD and the SPD was characterised by mutual hostility. The SPD had itself adopted the position that both the Nazis and the KPD posed an equal danger to liberal democracy and SPD leader Kurt Schumacher famously described the KPD as "red-painted Nazis" in 1930. The SPD-dominated Reichsbanner Schwarz-Rot-Gold described itself as a "protection organization of the Republic and democracy in the fight against the swastika and the Soviet star" and both the Reichsbanner and the Iron Front opposed both the Nazis and the anti-fascist KPD.

In 1929, the KPD's paramilitary organisation, Roter Frontkämpferbund (Alliance of Red Front-Fighters), an effective predecessor of Antifaschistische Aktion, had been banned as extremist by the governing SPD. In December 1929, the KPD founded Antifaschistische Junge Garde as a successor to Roter Frontkämpferbund, which was banned.

Despite this animosity between party leaderships, on the ground there was considerable co-operation against the Nazis between rank and file activists of the KPD, SPD and other left groups such as in local anti-fascist committees and militias, particularly in 1932 as the fascists gained ground and calls for a united front by Leon Trotsky, August Thalheimer and other left leaders became more urgent. It was in this context that the KPD began to emphasise the specific threat of Nazism, leading to the formation of Antifaschistische Aktion and later the turn away from the "social fascism" doctrine.

The congress organised by the KPD in 1932, with Antifaschistische Aktion' logo flanked by Soviet banners (centre), imagery showing the KPD fighting capitalism (right) and imagery mocking the centre-left SPD (left), regarded by the KPD as social fascists

The 1932 congress organised by KPD dedicated energy to attacking the SPD. It featured a large Antifaschistische Aktion logo flanked by imagery that showed the KPD fighting the capitalists next to imagery openly mocking the SPD. The two-flag logo, designed by Association of Revolutionary Visual Artists members Max Gebhard and Max Keilson, remains a widely used symbol of militant anti-fascism.

How many people belonged to Antifaschistische Aktion is difficult to determine because there were no membership cards. Rather, it developed out of the practical participation. The Red Mass Self-Defence (RMSS) units were absorbed into Antifaschistische Aktion, forming the nuclei of the latter's Unity Committees, organised on a micro-local basis, e.g. in apartment buildings, factories or allotments.

As well as being involved in political streetfights, the RMSS and Antifaschistische Aktion used their militant approach to develop a comprehensive network of self-defence for communities targeted by the Nazis such as in "tenant protection" (Mieterschutz), action against evictions. Initially, the RMSS units had minimal formal membership, but in the second half of 1932 local executive boards were created to co-ordinate the activities of the KPD, the Kampfbund, the RMSS and the now illegal Roter Frontkämpferbund, with the RMSS given a more distinct and almost paramilitary defence role, often co-operating on an ad hoc basis with the Reichsbanner. At a local level, Antifaschistische Aktion worked with other left groups, including joint assemblies and demonstrations with SPD and other socialist groups, but the national KPD leadership continued to describe social democracy as the "main enemy".

After the forced dissolution in the wake of the Machtergreifung in 1933, the movement went underground. Theodore Draper argued that "the so-called theory of social fascism and the practice based on it constituted one of the chief factors contributing to the victory of German fascism in January 1933".

== Post-war committees ==
After the defeat of Nazi Germany, groups called Antifaschistische Aktion, Antifaschistische Ausschüsse, or Antifaschistische Kommittees, all typically abbreviated to antifa, spontaneously re-emerged in Germany in 1944, mainly involving veterans of pre-war KPD, KPO and SPD politics as well as some members of other democratic political parties and Christians who opposed the Nazi régime. Communists tended to make up at least half of the committees.

In the western zones, these anti-fascist committees began to recede by the late summer of 1945, marginalized by Allied bans on political organization and by re-emerging divisions between communists and others and the emerging state doctrine of anti-communism in what became West Germany. In East Germany, the antifa groups were absorbed into the new Stalinist state.

== Cold War ==
=== East Germany ===
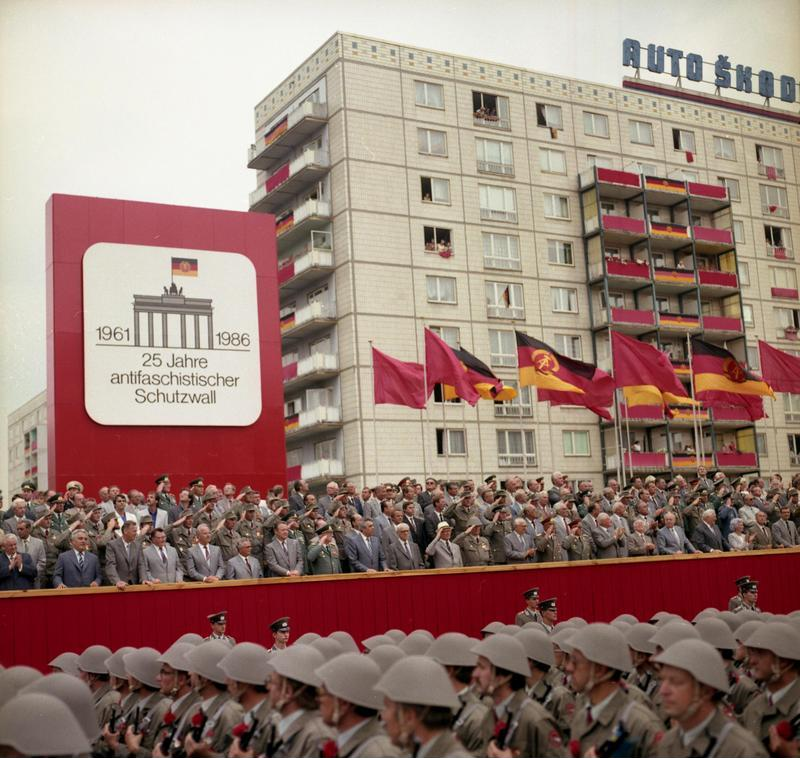
The Berlin Wall was officially referred to as the Anti-Fascist Protection Wall by East Germany.

In the Soviet occupation zone which later became East Germany, the Soviet occupation authorities pressured the KPD and the remaining Social Democratic Party of Germany (SPD) to merge into the Socialist Unity Party of Germany (SED) while those within the SPD who resisted the Stalinization were persecuted and often fled to the western zones. The repression in the Soviet occupation zone and the onset of the Cold War quickly exacerbated the conflict between the SED and the SPD. The term anti-fascism was widely used by Marxist–Leninists to smear their opponents, including democratic socialists, social democrats and other anti-Stalinist leftists.

Anti-fascism was part of the official ideology and language of the communist state and Antifaschistische Aktion was considered an important part of the heritage of the governing SED along with the KPD itself. Eckhard Jesse notes that anti-fascism was ubiquitous in the language of the SED and used to justify repression such as the crackdown on the East German uprising of 1953. Anti-fascism generally meant the struggle against the Western world and NATO in general and against the western-backed West Germany and its main ally the United States in particular which were seen as the main fascist forces in the world by the SED. From 1961 to 1989, the SED used Anti-Fascist Protection Wall (German: Antifaschistischer Schutzwall) as the official name for the Berlin Wall. This was in sharp contrast to the West Berlin city government which would sometimes refer to the same structure as the Wall of Shame.

The anti-Zionist struggle was seen as an important part of the anti-fascist struggle and Israel was regarded by East Germany as a "fascist state" alongside the United States and West Germany. Anti-fascism as interpreted by East Germany served as a "legitimizing ideology" and "state doctrine" of the regime. When the regime crumbled during the Revolutions of 1989, the SED intensified its use of anti-fascist rhetoric directed at the West to justify its existence.

=== West Germany ===
The contemporary antifa logo, based on the logo of Antifaschistische Aktion including a red flag representing communism and socialism and a black flag representing anarchism and autonomism (added in the 1980s)

The contemporary antifa movement has its origins in West Germany, in the student-based Außerparlamentarische Opposition (extra-parliamentary opposition) of the 1960s and early 1970s which opposed the alleged "fascism" of the West German government. Major factors that formed the backdrop of this movement were criticism of the Vietnam War and the United States, students' anti-authoritarian rebellion against their parents' generation, criticism of professors' dominance of universities and continuity of the societal relations of power, especially the continuity in the civil service since the Nazi era, and the criticism of the centre-left SPD by those to the left of the SPD.

The earliest contemporary antifa groups that were inspired by the left-wing student movement were founded by the Maoist Communist League in the early 1970s. During the 1970s, parts of the Außerparlamentarische Opposition were radicalized, culminating in the formation of militant groups like the Red Army Faction, the 2 June Movement and the Revolutionary Cells. Some of the more radical elements within antifa groups of the late 1970s had contact with the Red Army Faction and the Revolutionary Cells. From the late 1980s, the squatter scene and autonomism movement were important in an upswing of the antifa movement.

== Contemporary groups ==
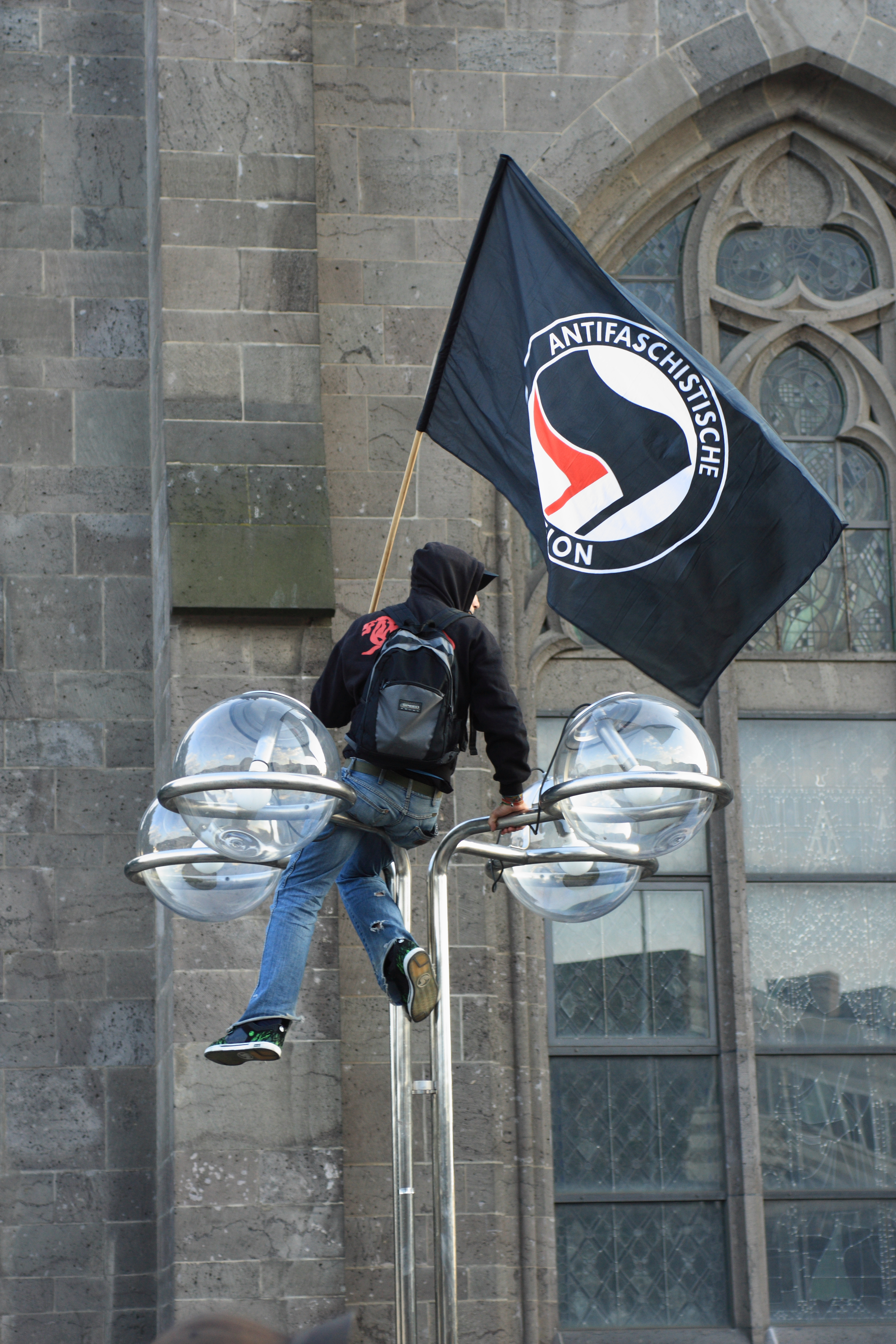
An antifa protester in Cologne, 2008

The contemporary antifa movement in Germany comprises different anti-fascist groups which usually use the abbreviation antifa and regard Antifaschistische Aktion of the early 1930s as an inspiration. Contemporary antifa "has no practical historical connection to the movement from which it takes its name, but is instead a product of West Germany's squatter scene and autonomist movement in the 1980s". Many new antifa groups formed from the late 1980s onwards. One of the biggest antifascist campaigns in Germany in recent years was the ultimately successful effort to block the annual Neo-Nazi marches in Dresden which had grown into "Europe's biggest gathering of Nazis".

Unlike Antifaschistische Aktion which had links to the Communist Party of Germany and which was concerned with industrial working-class politics, the late 1980s and early 1990s autonomists were instead independent anti-authoritarian libertarian Marxists and anarcho-communists not associated with any particular party. The publication Antifaschistisches Infoblatt, in operation since 1987, sought to expose radical nationalists publicly.

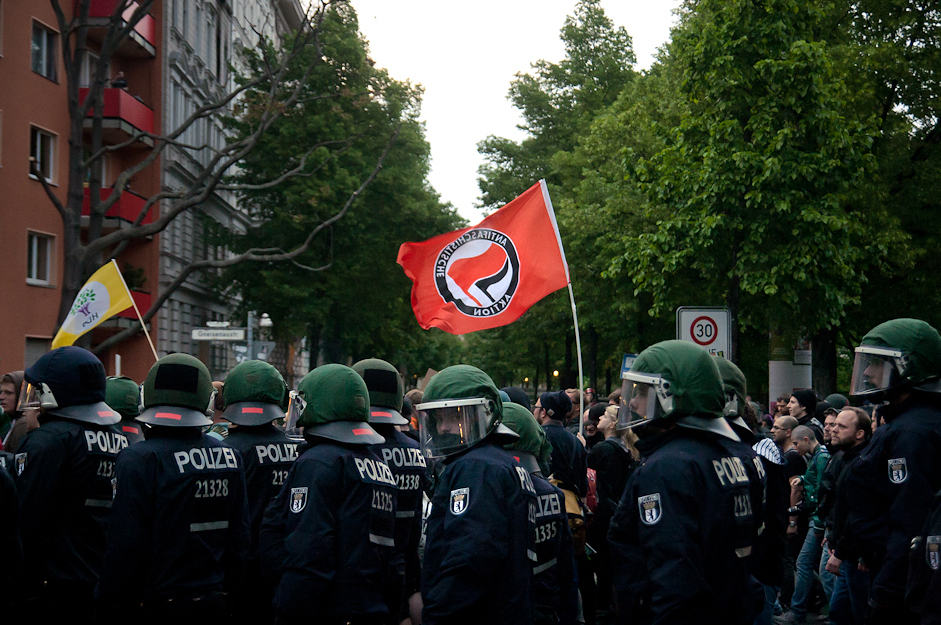
A demonstration by antifa on May Day 2014 in Berlin in which Bereitschaftspolizei are in the foreground

Most contemporary antifa groups were formed after the German reunification in 1990, mainly in the early part of the 1990s. In 1990, Autonome Antifa (M) was established in Göttingen. Antifaschistische Aktion Berlin, founded in 1993, became one of the more prominent groups. Antifaschistische Aktion/Bundesweite Organisation was an umbrella organisation at the federal level that coordinated these groups across Germany. Aside from their violent clashes with ultra-nationalists, these groups participated in the annual May Day in Kreuzberg which resulted in large-scale riots in 1987 and which have been characterized by a significant police presence. In 2003, Antifaschistisches Infoblatt joined Antifa-Net, part of an international network, including the likes of Britain's Searchlight and Sweden's Expo magazine.

Steffen Kailitz asserted in 2013 that "the difference between the autonomist scene and terrorist networks gradually lost importance from the 1990s" and that a number of antifa groups were involved in violent activities from the 1990s. In October 2016, antifa in Dresden campaigned on the occasion of the anniversary of the reunification of Germany on 3 October for "turning Unity celebrations into a disaster" to protest this display of new German nationalism whilst explicitly not ruling out the use of violence. Antifa protesters were involved during the 2017 G20 Hamburg summit confrontations. In the 2020s Antifa OST, also known as Hammerbande, performed attacks against far-right extemists, such as in Budapest and Dresden, resulting in the group being designated as terrorists by the US.

=== Main factions and ideology ===
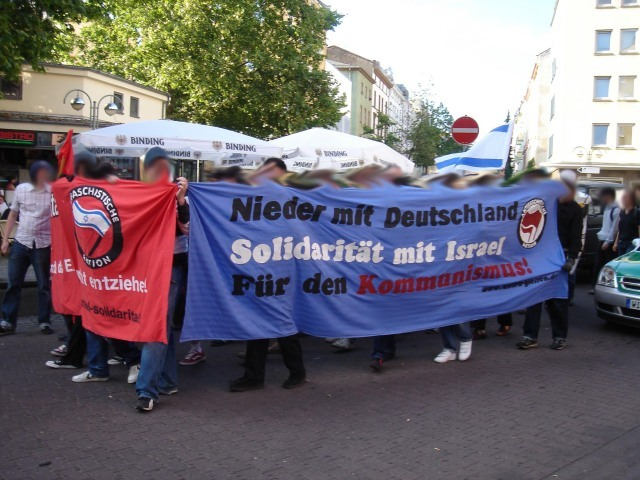
Protesters belonging to the Anti-German wing of antifa, carrying the slogan "Down with Germany/Solidarity with Israel/For Communism" with an antifa logo

After German reunification, the antifa movement gradually fractured into three main camps:

- Anti-imperialists, the largest group, who take an anti-imperialist position and most closely adhere to the traditional position taken within the movement and communist parties generally, tending to view politics in terms of how a country relates to the West and seeing anti-Zionism as part of the anti-fascist struggle.
- Anti-Germans, who emphasize their opposition to Germany as a country, support Israel and oppose the anti-imperialist antifa and the mainstream left.
- Those who have no position on Israel or who see it as irrelevant to questions of contemporary anti-fascism in Germany.

Diverging opinions on Israel has caused a split in the movement since the 2000s. The Antifaschistische Aktion/Bundesweite Organisation dissolved in 2001 and it splintered into different groups and factions as a result of these political differences.

Writing in 1993, political scientist Antonia Grunenberg described "anti-fascism" as a "strange term, that expresses opposition to something, but no political concept" and points out that while all democrats are against fascism, not everyone who is against fascism is a democrat. In this sense, Grunenberg argues that the term obscures the difference between democrats and non-democrats.

In German, the terms antifa and anti-fascism are often used interchangeably. According to the Federal Office for the Protection of the Constitution, many contemporary antifa groups include their understanding of various forms of oppression or general and loosely defined topics such as homophobia, racism, sexism and war in their understanding of fascism. Frequently, corporate interests, the government and especially the police and military are also included in their understanding of fascism. According to political scientist and CDU politician Tim Peters, writing in 2007, usage of the term anti-fascism in contemporary Germany is mainly limited to the far-left while the term and ideology are viewed critically by many.

=== Symbolism ===
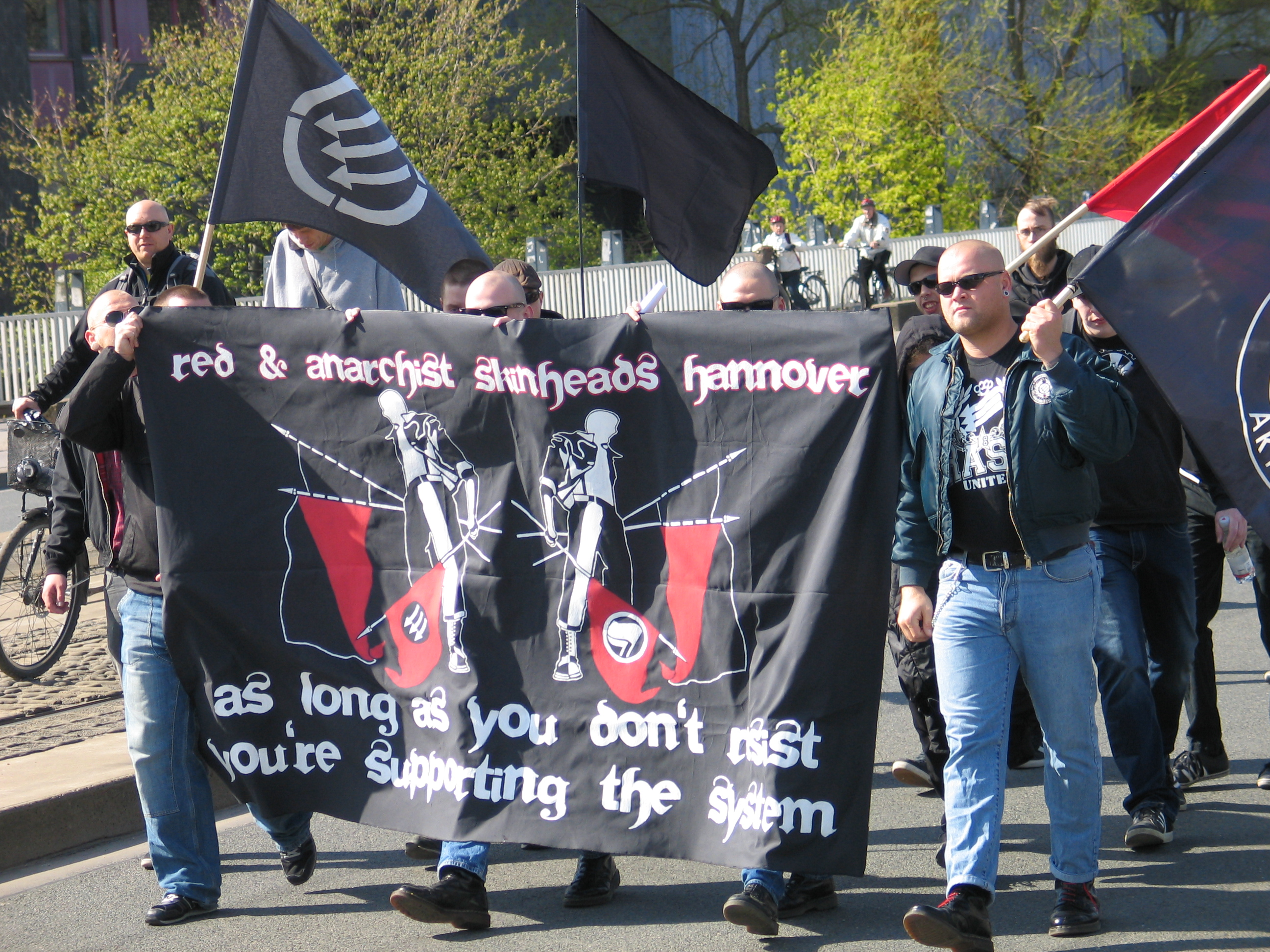
Antifa protesters with a banner reading: "Red & Anarchist Skinheads Hannover; as long as you don't resist you're supporting the system"

Many contemporary antifa groups have adopted variants of the aesthetics of Antifaschistische Aktion. Its two-flag logo was originally designed by Max Gebhard and Max Keilson of the KPD-associated Association of Revolutionary Visual Artists. While the original logo of Antifaschistische Aktion featured two red flags representing communism and socialism, contemporary antifa logos since the 1980s usually feature a black flag representing anarchism and autonomism, in addition to the red flag.

The 1930s logo of Antifaschistische Aktion

The logo of Antifaschistische Aktion

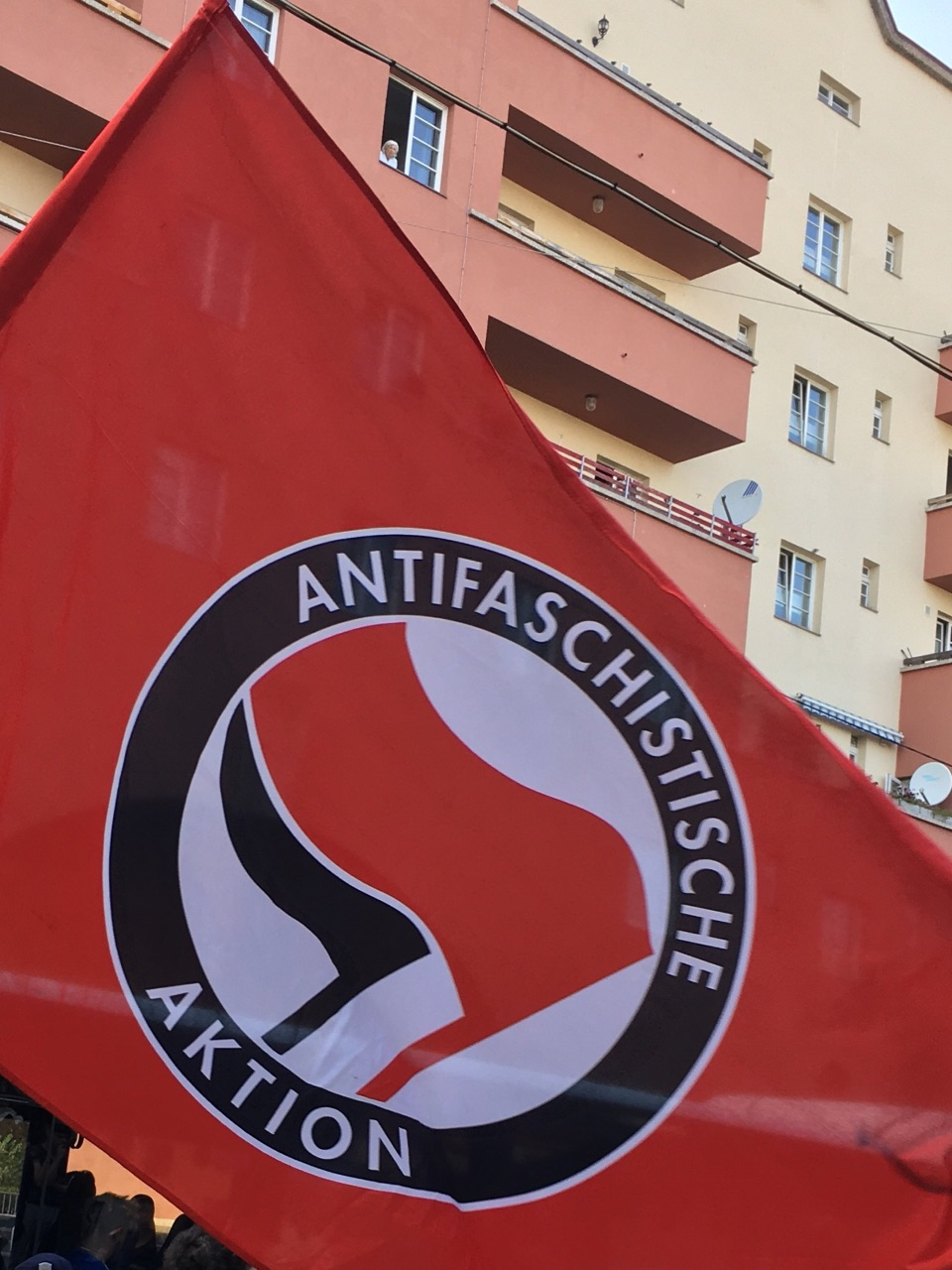
The logo of Antifaschistische Aktion on a red flag

Toilet brush symbol adopted for the Hamburg protests

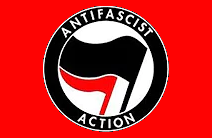
The red flag of its American counterpart, Antifascist Action

=== Government and police monitoring and prosecution ===
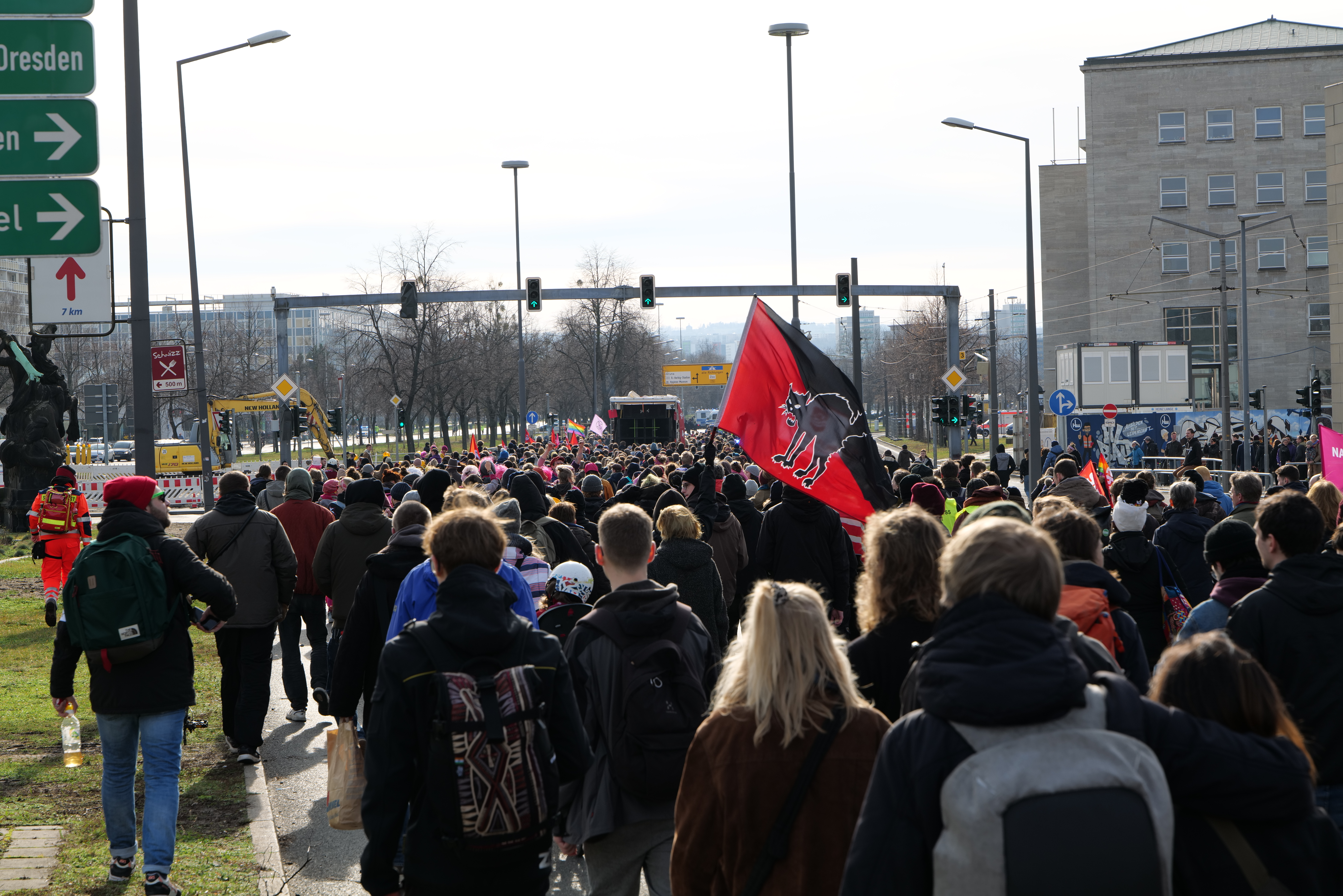
Antifa protest in Dresden, 15 February 2020

German state institutions such as the Federal Office for the Protection of the Constitution and the Federal Agency for Civic Education describe the contemporary antifa movement as part of the extreme left and antifa groups are monitored by the federal office in the context of its legal mandate to combat extremism under the provisions allowed for by the German system of a Streitbare Demokratie ("fortified democracy").

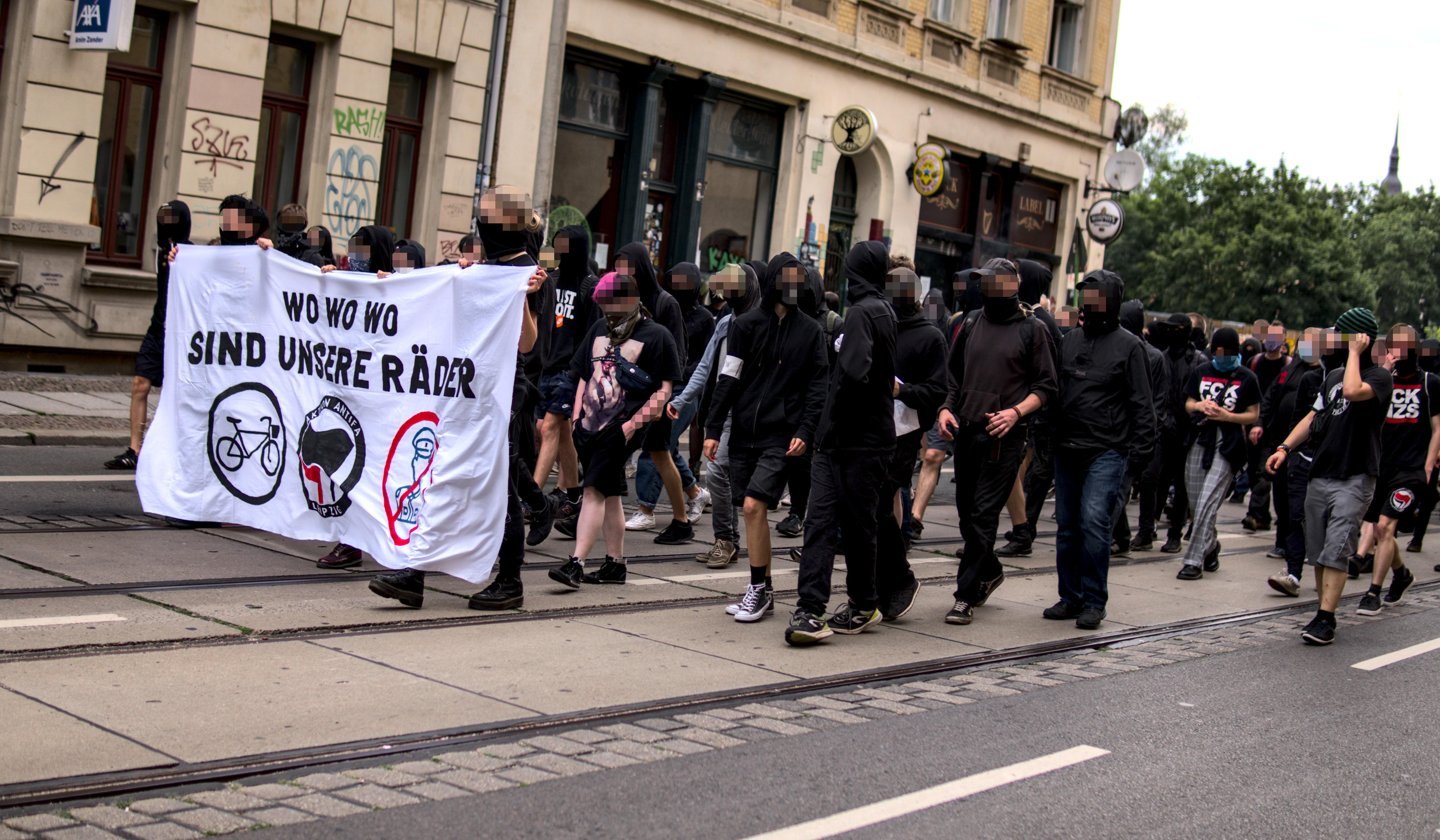
Antifa black block in Leipzig, 17 June 2020

The Federal Agency for Civic Education claims that antifa groups sometimes call for violence not only against police or skinheads but also against bishops and judges. According to the agency, there are slogans such as "antifascism means attack" not only against the far-right but also against the political system of the Federal Republic of Germany. Writing for the Federal Agency for Civic Education, extremism expert Armin Pfahl-Traughber, a former director with the Federal Office for the Protection of the Constitution, notes that "even if every convinced democrat is an opponent of fascism, anti-fascism is not per se a democratic position". According to Pfahl-Traughber, one must distinguish between "fascism in a scholarly sense" and "fascism in a far-left extremist sense".

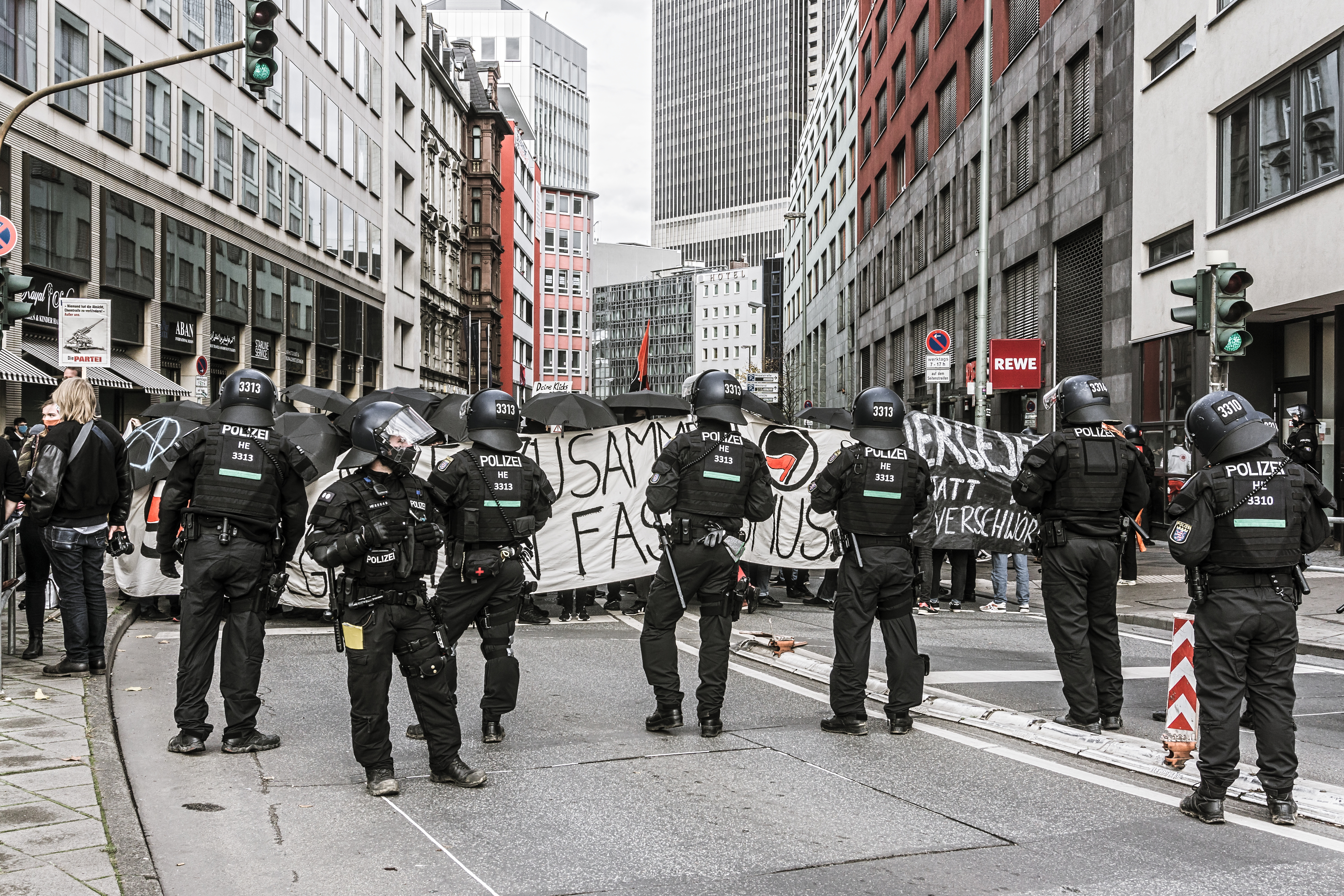
Antifa black block in Frankfurt, 14 November 2020

The Federal Office for the Protection of the Constitution describes the field of "anti-fascism" or "Antifa" as extremist and includes it and associated groups in its annual public reports on extremism as part of the topic "far-left extremism". The federal office further says that "[t]he field of 'anti-fascism' has for years been a central element of the political activity of far-left extremists, especially violent ones. [...] Far-left extremists within this tradition only superficially claim to fight far-right activities. In reality the focus is the struggle against the liberal democratic basic order, which is smeared as a 'capitalist system' with 'fascist' roots".

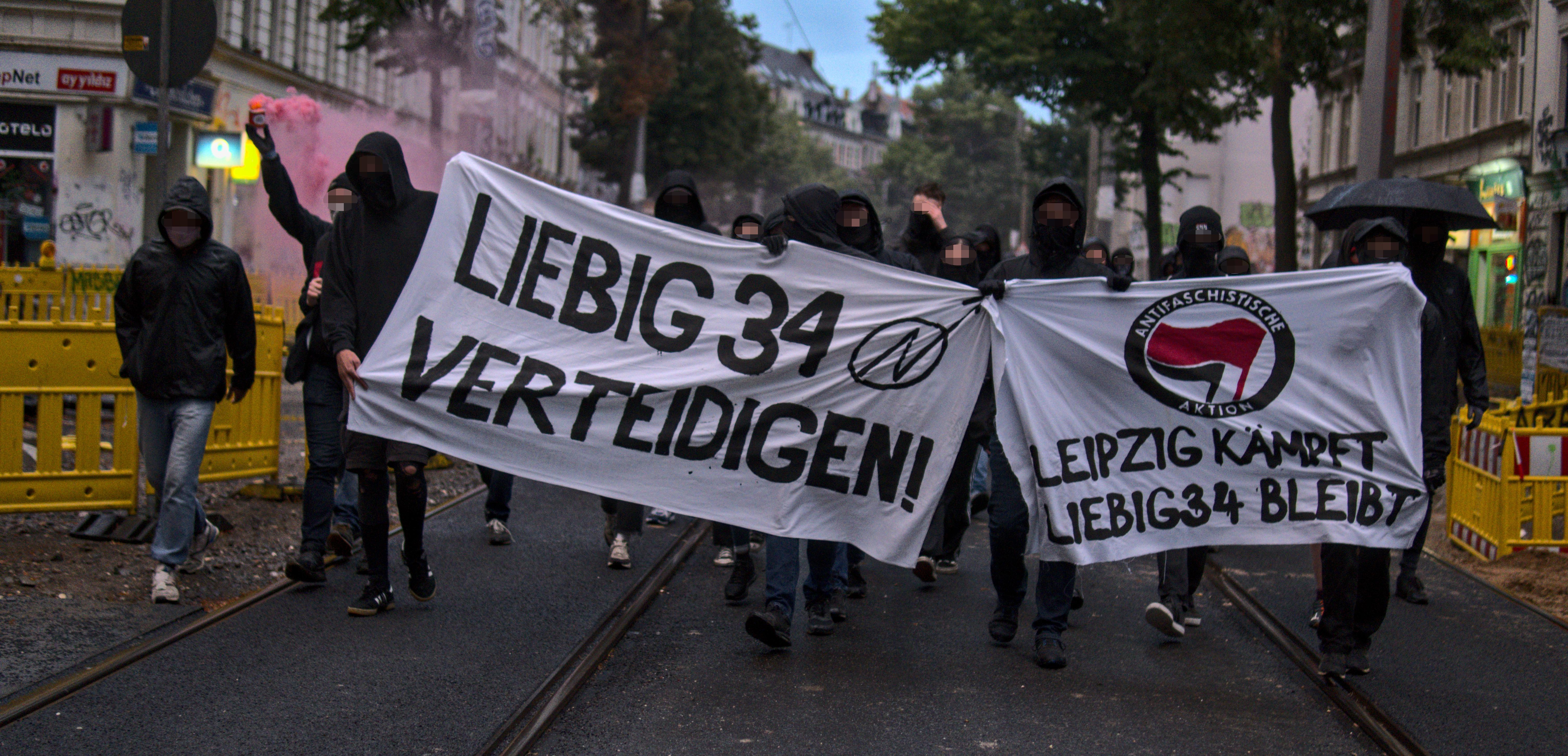
Antifa demonstration in support of Liebig 34

The contemporary antifa or anti-fascist movement in the Federal Republic of Germany has been mentioned in the Annual Report on the Protection of the Constitution since 1986 as part of the main chapter on "far-left extremism" and was described as a group engaged in terrorist acts of violence. In 1995, public prosecutors in Lower Saxony charged 17 members of antifa with belonging to a criminal organization ("Antifa") and with supporting terrorism as part of a sweeping investigation into antifa by Lower Saxon police and security agencies known as the anti-antifa investigation that started in 1991 until the case was dropped in 1996. A report by the German Bundestag from 2018 determined that due to the lack of a formal organizational structure or leadership, it is only possible to prosecute members of antifa on terrorism charges in individual cases.

According to the 2018 Annual Report on the Protection of the Constitution, antifa's actions against right-wing extremists included arson, the outing of personal information, vandalism and more rarely causing personal injuries. In 2020, Die Welt reported that at least 47 organised antifa groups are monitored by German federal and state offices for the protection of the constitution and labelled as "extremist". However, not all monitored groups are mentioned in the federal or state annual reports on the protection of the constitution and the list is therefore not exhaustive.

== See also ==
- Conny Wessmann
- Far-right politics in Germany (1945–present)

== Sources ==
- Rosenhaft, Eve (25 August 1983). Beating the Fascists?: The German Communists and Political Violence 1929-1933. Cambridge University Press.
