= Joan McGuire Mohr =

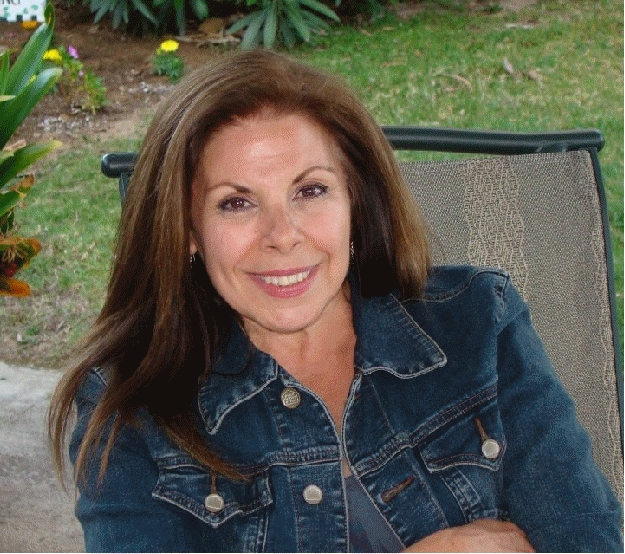
Joan McGuire Mohr

Joan McGuire Mohr is an American historian and writer in military history, historical fiction, and biography.

As an immigration historian she specializes in Slavic Immigration to the United States. Mohr consulted as a Research Fellow for the Institute for Learning at the University of Pittsburgh, and for museums in the United States and Central Europe.

== Work ==
Mohr's area of expertise is American Immigration History with an emphasis on Czech and Slovak homeland and host settlement conditions post 1850 to World War I.

Mohr described the role of the Czechoslovak Legion during the Russian Revolution in her book, The Czech and Slovak Legion in Siberia from 1917 to 1922 (2012).

Mohr's work, The Blood Orphans, a three book historical fiction series, covers the post World War II era in Czechoslovakia and the death of Jan Masaryk in 1948.
