= Post–World War II anti-fascism =

Opposition to fascism after World War II

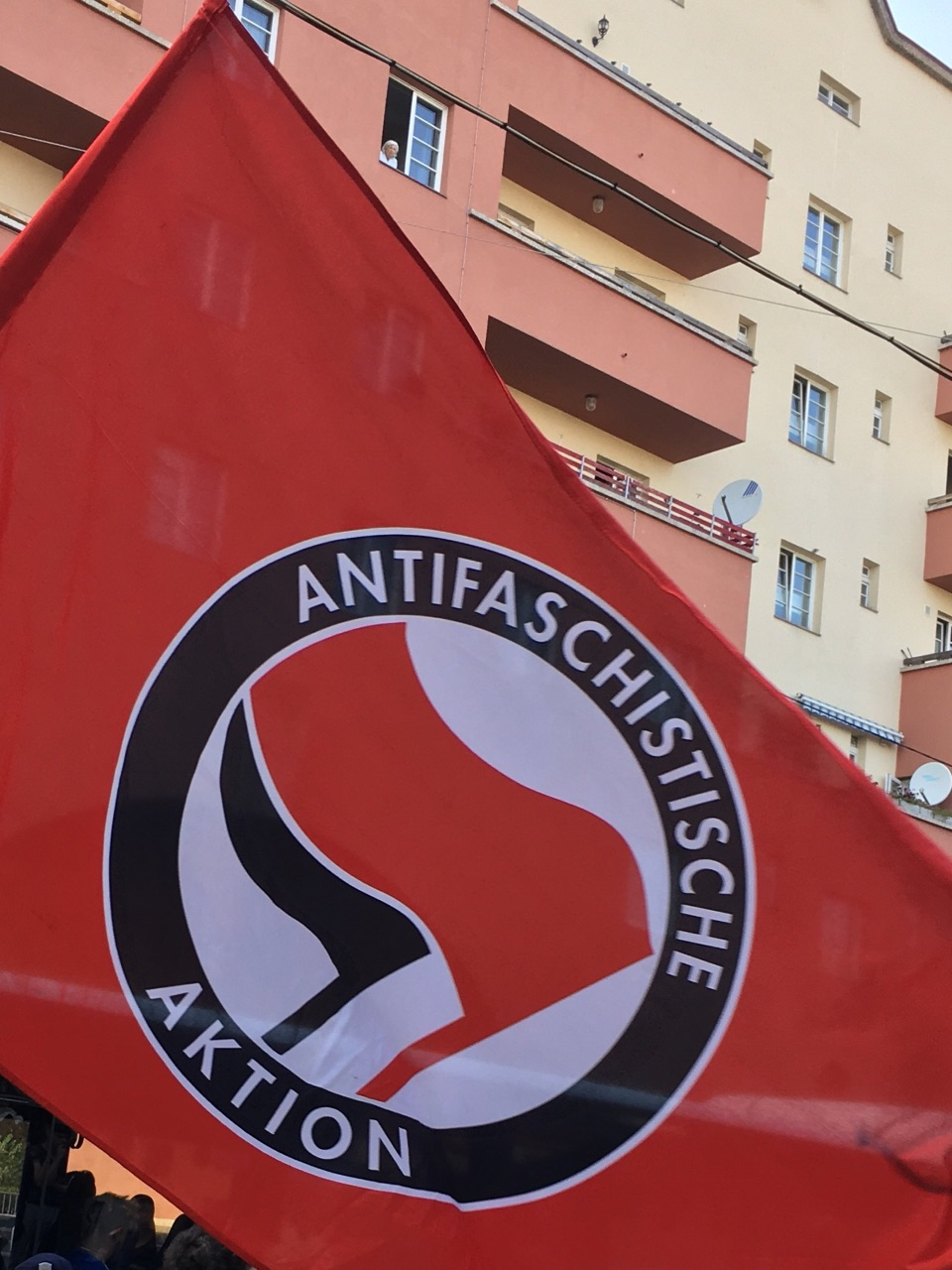
A red flag with modern Antifaschistische Aktion, commonly shortened to Antifa

Post–World War II anti-fascism, including antifa groups (/ˈæntifɑː, ænˈtiːfə/), anti-fascist movements and anti-fascist action networks, saw the development of political movements describing themselves as anti-fascist and in opposition to fascism. Those movements have been active in several countries in the aftermath of World War II during the second half of the 20th and early 21st century.

== Europe ==
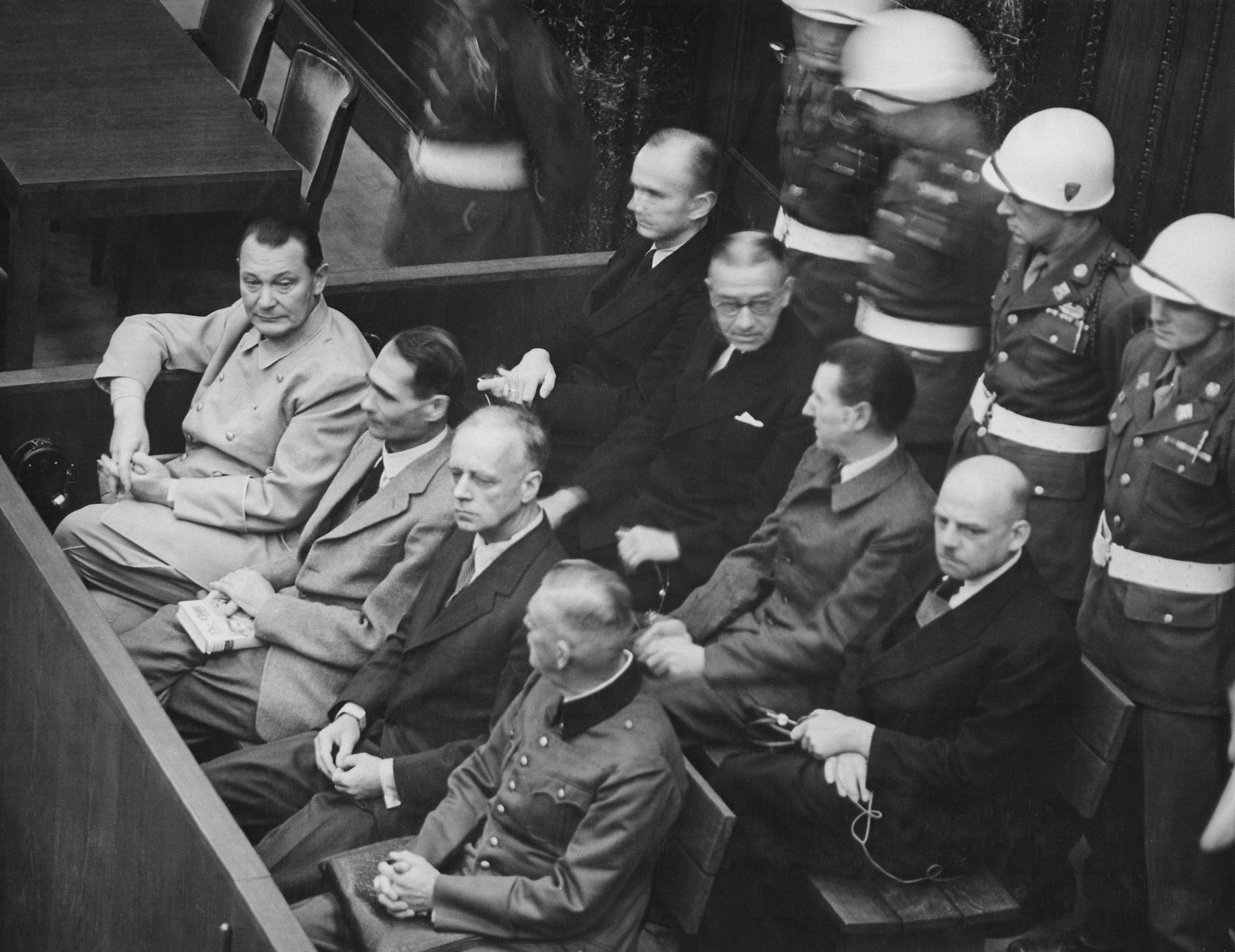
Defendants in the Nuremberg Trials - a judicial-political process intended to delegitimize Nazism, and Fascism more broadly, as criminal ideologies

The immediate aftermath of the Second World War saw Fascism and its ideological successors discredited as the ideologies of the defeated Axis powers, with the eradication of Fascist ideologies a stated goal of the victorious Allies, culminating in processes like the Nuremberg trials and de-Nazification. The onset however, of the Cold War saw the urgency attached to these goals diminish in the face of superpower competition, and anti-fascist activities becoming less prominent.

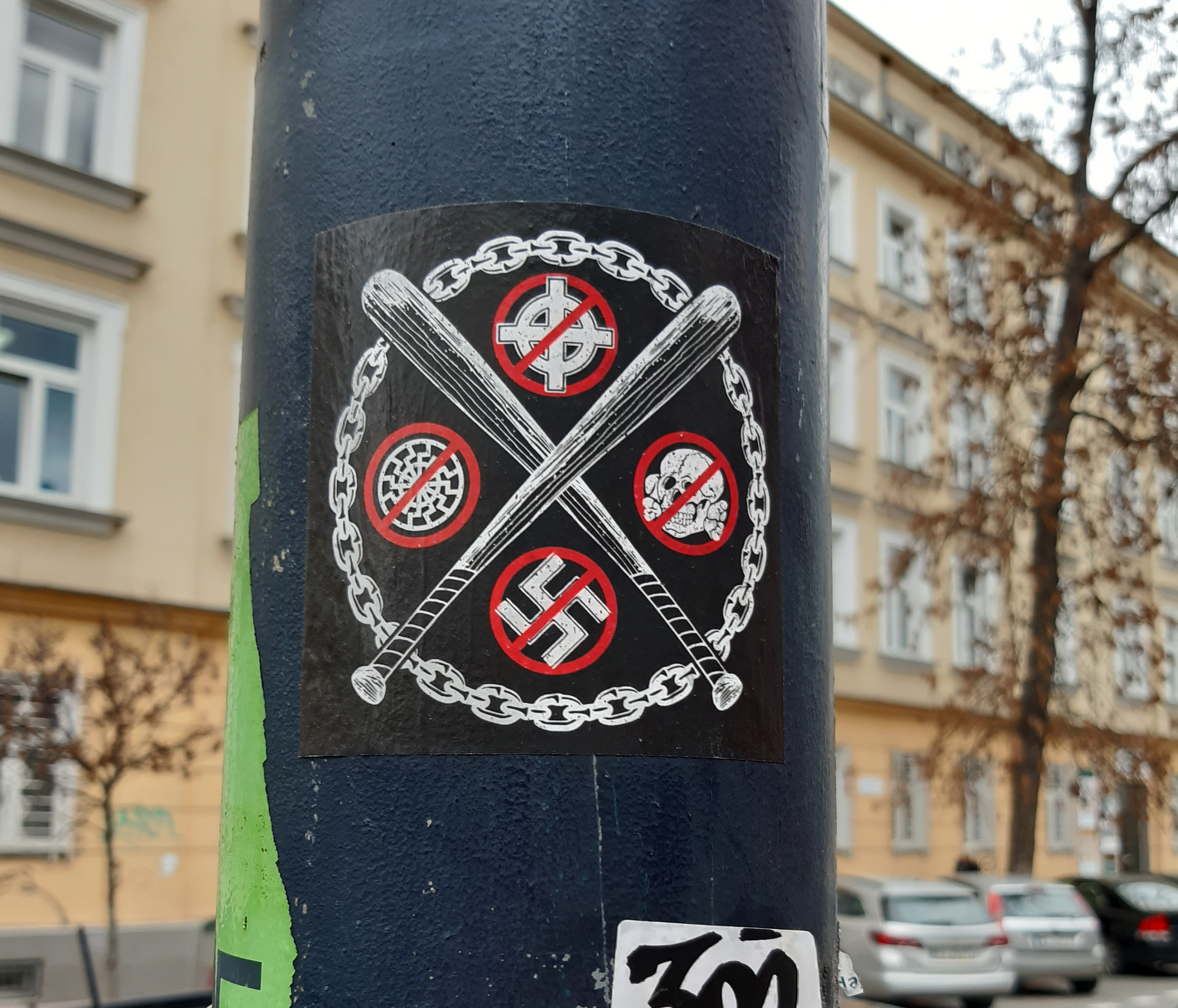
An antifascist sticker in Warsaw, Poland

The appearance of rightist political parties and their upsurge since the dissolution of the Soviet Union has stimulated a corresponding growth of anti-fascist movements. In Germany Neo-Nazism was never eradicated, and former Nazis including Reinhard Gehlen and former chancellor Kurt Georg Kiesinger rose to positions of great power. The Freedom Party of Austria was founded by politicians including former Nazis in 1955. In France, where the far-right National Rally was founded in 1972.

In post-WWII Great Britain, skinheads and football hooligans often promoted vehement racism; the English Defence League was founded in 2009. The Netherlands has seen the rise of a number of rightist parties, starting with the Centre Party, then the NVU, and then the PVV with Geert Wilders and the young Forum voor Democratie. The German right has grown rapidly since the Fall of the Berlin Wall, and the far-right party Alternative for Germany was founded in 2013, followed shortly thereafter by the anti-immigrant Pegida movement.

The war ends in Italy on 2 May 1945, with the complete surrender of German and RSI forces to the Allied forces, as formally established during the so-called Surrender at Caserta on 29 April 1945, marks the definitive defeat of Nazism and Fascism in Italy. By 1 May, all of northern Italy was liberated from occupation, including Bologna (21 April), Genoa (23 April), Milan (25 April), Turin and Venice (28 April). The liberation put an end to two and a half years of German occupation, five years of war, and twenty-three years of fascist dictatorship.

The aftermath of World War II left Italy bitter toward the monarchy for endorsing the Fascist regime for over 20-plus years. These frustrations contributed to a revival of the Italian republican movement.

The liberation symbolically represents the beginning of the historical journey which led to the referendum of 2 June 1946, when Italians opted for the end of the monarchy and the creation of the Italian Republic. This was followed by the adoption of the 1948 Constitution of the Republic, created by the Constituent Assembly and representatives from the anti-fascist forces that defeated the Nazis and the Fascists during the liberation of Italy and the Italian civil war.

=== Italy ===
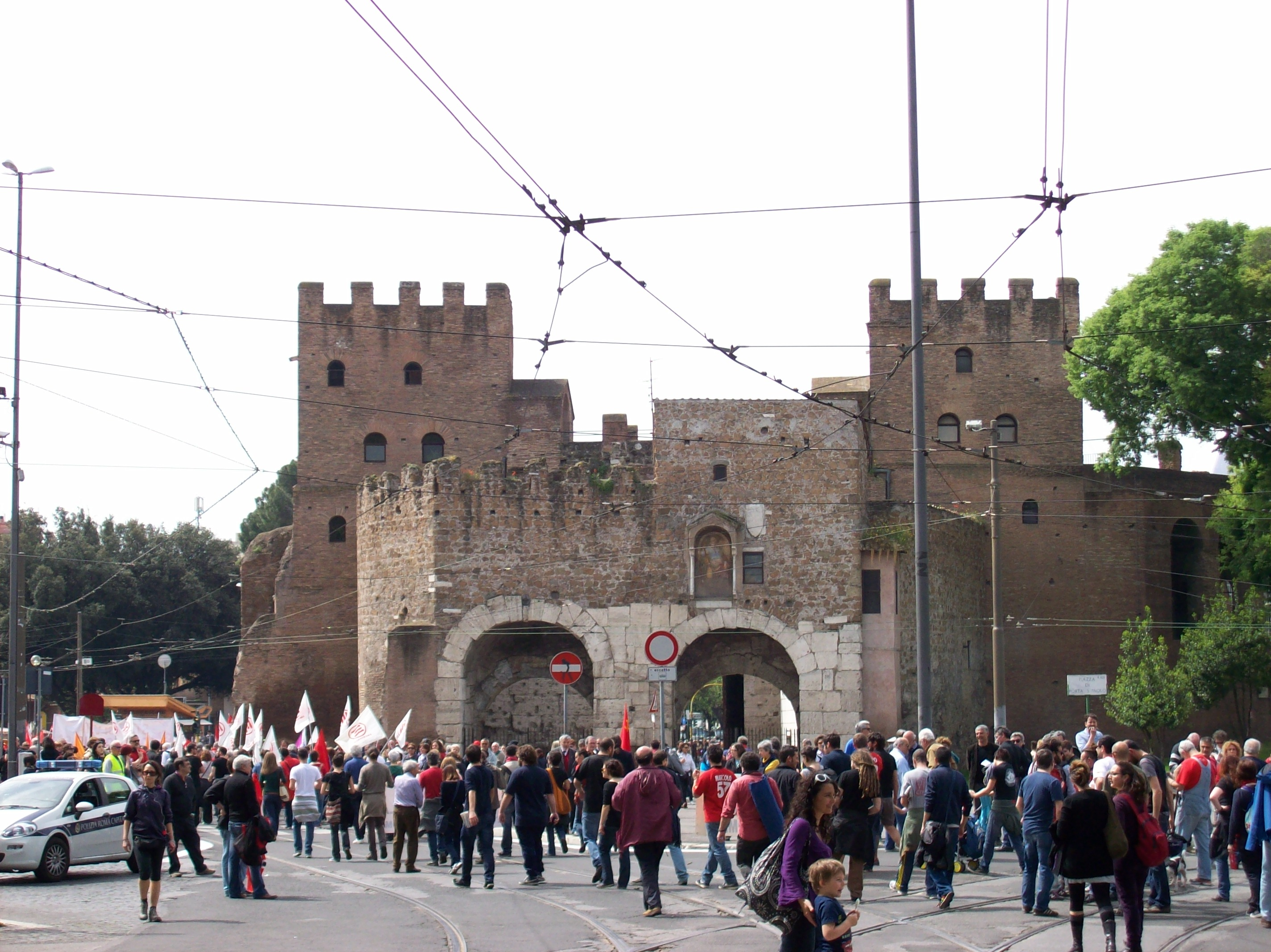
Anti-fascist demonstration at Porta San Paolo in Rome, Italy, on the occasion of the Liberation Day on 25 April 2013

Today's Italian constitution is the result from the work of a Constituent Assembly formed by the representatives of all the anti-fascist forces that contributed to the defeat of Nazi and Fascist forces during the liberation of Italy.

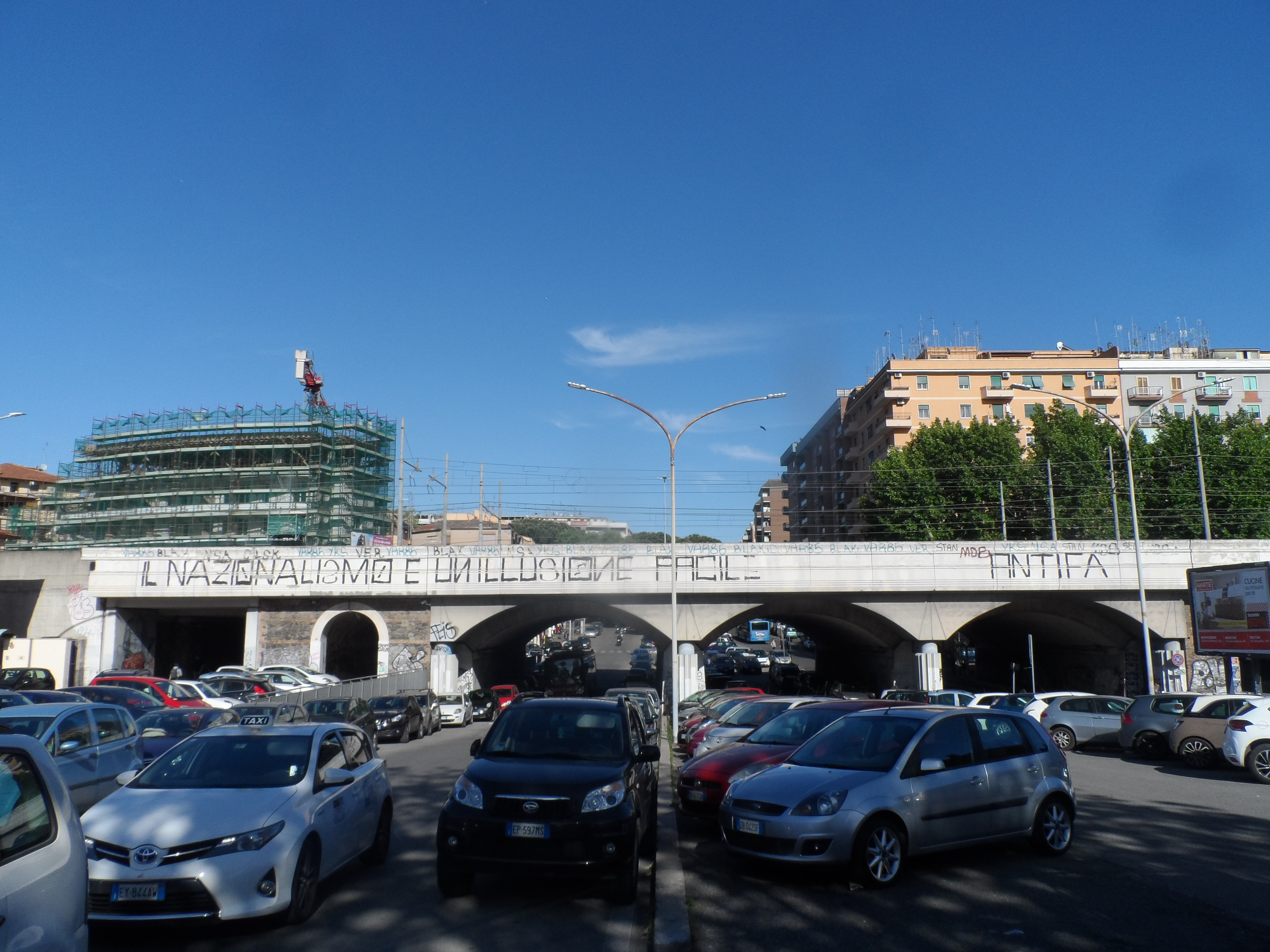
Antifa graffiti in Rome: Nationalism is an easy illusion.

Bella ciao (instrumental only version performed by the Band of the Guard of the Serbian Armed Forces)

Liberation Day is a national holiday in Italy that commemorates the victory of the Italian resistance movement against Nazi Germany and the Italian Social Republic, puppet state of the Nazis and rump state of the fascists, in the Italian Civil War, a civil war in Italy fought during World War II, which takes place on 25 April. The date was chosen by convention, as it was the day of the year 1945 when the National Liberation Committee of Upper Italy (CLNAI) officially proclaimed the insurgency in a radio announcement, propounding the seizure of power by the CLNAI and proclaiming the death sentence for all fascist leaders (including Benito Mussolini, who was shot three days later).

Associazione Nazionale Partigiani d'Italia (ANPI; "National Association of Italian Partisans") is an association founded by participants of the Italian resistance against the Italian Fascist regime and the subsequent Nazi occupation during World War II. ANPI was founded in Rome in 1944 while the war continued in northern Italy. It was constituted as a charitable foundation on 5 April 1945. It persists due to the activity of its antifascist members.

ANPI's objectives are the maintenance of the historical role of the partisan war by means of research and the collection of personal stories. Its goals are a continued defense against historical revisionism and the ideal and ethical support of the high values of freedom and democracy expressed in the 1948 constitution, in which the ideals of the Italian resistance were collected. Since 2008, every two years ANPI organizes its national festival. During the event, meetings, debates, and musical concerts that focus on antifascism, peace, and democracy are organized.

Bella ciao (Italian pronunciation: [ˈbɛlla ˈtʃaːo]; "Goodbye beautiful") is an Italian folk song modified and adopted as an anthem of the Italian resistance movement by the partisans who opposed nazism and fascism, and fought against the occupying forces of Nazi Germany, who were allied with the fascist and collaborationist Italian Social Republic between 1943 and 1945 during the Italian Civil War. Versions of this Italian anti-fascist song continue to be sung worldwide as a hymn of freedom and resistance. As an internationally known hymn of freedom, it was intoned at many historic and revolutionary events. The song originally aligned itself with Italian partisans fighting against Nazi German occupation troops, but has since become to merely stand for the inherent rights of all people to be liberated from tyranny.

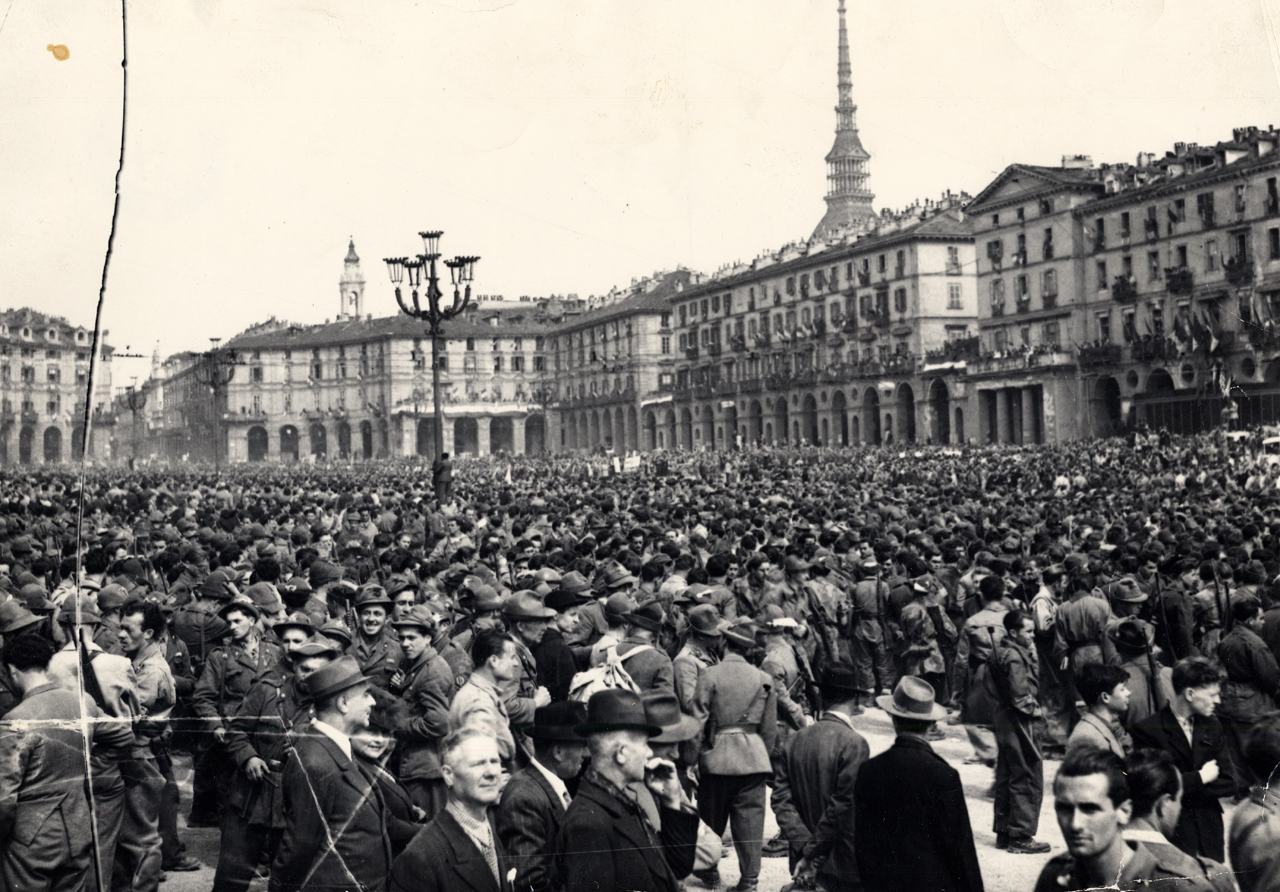
A parade for the liberation of Italy, Turin, 6 May 1945

The ANPI logo

=== Germany ===
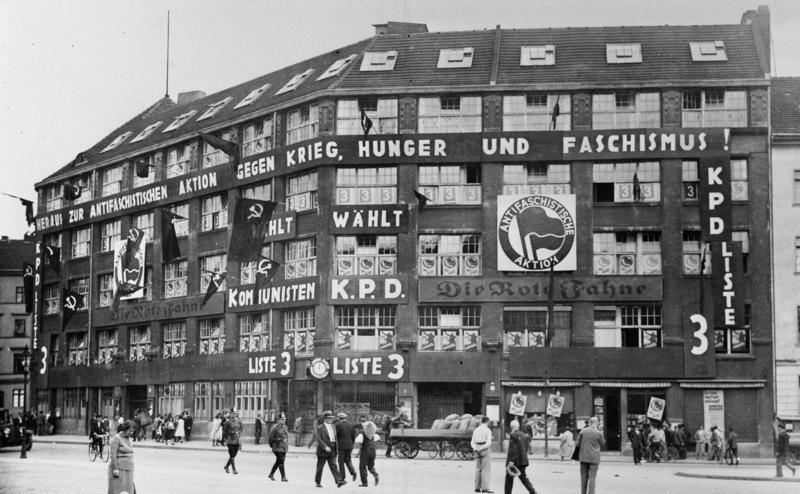
The historical seat of the Communist Party of Germany (Karl-Liebknecht-Haus) with prominently displayed logo of the Antifaschistische Aktion, 1932

In 1944, after the defeat of Nazi Germany, groups called Antifaschistische Ausschüsse, Antifaschistische Kommittees or Antifaschistische Aktion, all typically abbreviated to Antifa, spontaneously re-emerged in Germany, mainly involving veterans of pre-war KPD, KPO and SPD politics as well as some members of other democratic political parties and the Confessing Church, which had opposed the Nazi co-optation of the Lutheran Church during the 1930s and 1940s. Communists tended to make up at least half of the committees.

In the western zones, these anti-fascist committees began to recede by the late summer of 1945, marginalized by Allied bans on political organization and by re-emerging divisions between Communists and others and the emerging state doctrine of anti-communism in what became West Germany. In East Germany, the Antifa groups were absorbed into the new Stalinist state.

The subsequent post-war history of the anti-fascist movement in Germany includes two distinct traditions, an East German tradition and a tradition that arose in West Germany during the 1970s, both drawing inspiration from the Antifa committees and from the earlier Antifaschistische Aktion of the Weimar Republic. According to German government institutions the Federal Office for the Protection of the Constitution and the Federal Agency for Civic Education, the contemporary Antifa or anti-fascist movement in Germany—the terms are often used interchangeably in German—is composed of multiple far-left, autonomous, militant groups and individuals who describe themselves as anti-fascist. According to the Federal Office for the Protection of the Constitution, the use of the epithet fascist against opponents and the understanding of capitalism as a form of fascism are central to the movement.

According to political scientist and Christian Democratic Union politician Tim Peters, the term anti-fascism is primarily used by the far left in contemporary Germany.

In Communist East Germany, "anti-fascism" as interpreted within the Communist movement was part of the official ideology and language of the Communist state, and the original Antifaschistische Aktion ("Anti-Fascist Action") of the Communist Party of Germany was considered an important part of the heritage of the governing Socialist Unity Party of Germany; Eckhard Jesse, director of the Hannah Arendt Institute for the Research on Totalitarianism, notes that the term "anti-fascism" was ubiquitous in the language of the East German Communist party, and used to justify repression such as the crackdown on the East German uprising of 1953.

"Antifascism" in East Germany generally meant the struggle against the western world and NATO in general, and against the western-backed Federal Republic of Germany and its main ally the United States in particular, which were seen as the main fascist forces in the world by the East German Communist party. For example, from 1961 to 1989, the East German regime used the term "Anti-Fascist Protection Wall" (German: Antifaschistischer Schutzwall) as the official name for the Berlin Wall.

The contemporary German Antifa movement ultimately has its origins in West Germany, in the student-based Außerparlamentarische Opposition (extra-parliamentary opposition) of the 1960s and early 1970s which opposed the alleged "fascism" of the West German government. The modern movement largely adopted the aesthetics of the Antifaschistische Aktion during the late Weimar Republic, including the abbreviated name Antifa and a version of its logo, while being ideologically somewhat dissimilar.

The first Antifa groups in this tradition were founded by the Maoist Communist League in the early 1970s. Antifa women, dissatisfied with observed sexism in the movement, created the feminist offshoot Fantifa in 1985. From the late 1980s, West Germany's squatter scene and left-wing autonomism movement were the main contributors to the new Antifa movement and in contrast to the earlier movement had a more anarcho-communist leaning. The modern movement has splintered into different groups and factions, including one anti-imperialist and anti-Zionist faction and one anti-German faction who strongly oppose each other. German government institutions describe the contemporary Antifa movement as part of the extreme left and as partially violent, and Antifa groups are monitored by the federal office in the context of its legal mandate to combat extremism; the federal office states that the underlying goal of the Antifa movement is "the struggle against the liberal democratic basic order" and capitalism.

=== Ireland ===
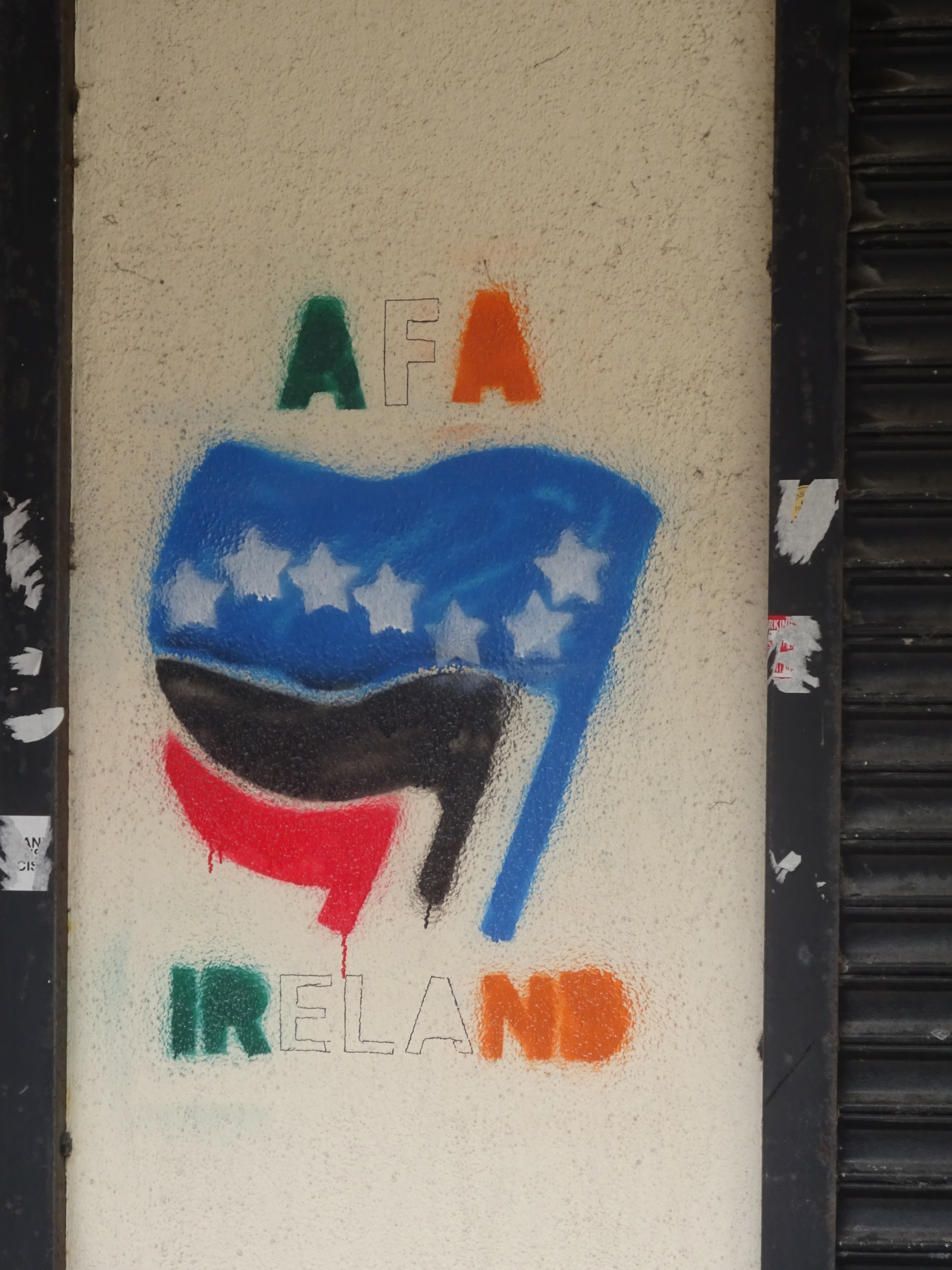
Antifa Graffiti in Longford, Ireland. It incorporates the Starry Plough, a traditional Irish left-wing symbol. Jonathan Arlow has written that "a close cultural lineage between elements within the left and a past revolutionary tradition will increase the appeal of anti-fascist activism among left-wing activists."

Anti-fascist groups have emerged in the Republic of Ireland to oppose far-right and alt-right groups such as the National Party, Irish Freedom Party, Identity Ireland and Pegida Ireland, which lack significant public or electoral support but stage occasional rallies and are active online.

Anti-Fascist Action (AFA) Ireland is one group, while an alliance called Le Chéile (Irish: "together") was founded in 2020 to combat the far-right.

PhD student Jonathan Arlow has written on the topic, saying "in the absence of effective extreme right forces, anti-fascism acts as a form of prophylactic action. In effect, the aim of this activism is to deny political space to extreme right micro groups before they become a popular force or a more serious political threat."

=== Netherlands ===
A well-known Dutch anti-fascist research group is the anti-fascist research group Kafka. The Netherlands also has several chapters of the international network Anti-Fascist Action (AFA / Antifa). Another anti-fascist association in the Netherlands is AFVN / Bond van Anti-fascisten (Dutch League of Former Resistants and Anti-Fascists), founded in 1968 by Communist resistance fighters from the Second World War, to warn against resurging fascism.

From 2000 onwards, the AFVN protested several fascist-inspired events and phenomena. The re-appearance of a Dutch opera-singer Johannes Heesters, who performed for the Nazis and was even photographed when visiting Dachau concentration camp and befriending SS-officers, led to loud protest that were nationally published.

The AFVN has had numerous successes, although the group remains relatively small. It effectively uses publicity as its main tool of influence. Some of the actions and events include the following:

- protesting a yearly commemoration of Nazi-graves on the day of national remembrance of the war dead, the 4th of May in Vorden; this remembrance was stopped
- protesting commemorations by the German ambassador and members of the Bundeswehr at the Ysselsteyn German war cemetery, the largest in Europa containing about 31,000 Nazi-soldiers, SS and Dutch war criminal; after a petition and support from Jewish organisations such as Zentralrat der Juden in Berlin and Beate Klarsfeld and the management of Dachau concentration camp the ambassador relented in 2020
- protesting the selling of Nazi-items at dedicated trade fairs and by Dutch eBay subsidiary Marktplaats.nl; Marktplaats has since banished the sale of any item containing swastikas; two of these fairs closed
- protesting the sale of anti-semitic books by Dutch Ahold Delhaize subsidiary Bol.nl; these sales were halted
- protesting the sale of two books containing extensive falsehoods on WW-II or the resistance and/or anti-Semitic utterances, namely the SS-admiring 'De SS'ers' ('The SS') by Armando and Sleutelaar and 'Grijs Verleden' ('Grey Past') by C. van der Heyden
- the commemoration of the so-called February strike against persecution of Jews in the region of Hilversum since 2015;
- protesting the commemoration of fallen Dutch aggressors from the Indonesian War of Independence from 1947 till 1950 in Roermond
- protesting the unwarranted honoring the writer Armando, author of the SS-admiring book 'De SS'ers' in former Amersfoort concentration camp; the event was canceled.

The AFVN is a member of the Féd. Int. des Résistants FIR.

Some of the AFA-groups are more active than others. The AFA-Fryslân (Frisia) is regionally one of the most active, especially combating the Dutch extreme right and their parties, such as the PVV and Forum voor Democratie. AFA-Fryslân regularly cooperates with the AFVN.

Another relatively successful venture is the yearly anti-discrimination march in Amsterdam on 21 March, organised by a coalition of 15 progressive groups. The coalition is named '21 Maart Tegen Racisme' ('21 March Against Racism').

Some of the Dutch anti-fascists, mostly of so-called 'autonomous' groups, but not Kafka or the AFVN, regard physical violence as a legitimate means of action. An example of this was the violent disruption of the reconciliation meeting between Hans Janmaat and the Center Party on March 29, 1986, in a hotel in Kedichem. The meeting was disrupted by radical, anti-fascist activists who set the hotel on fire. Janmaat's life partner Wil Schuurman became permanently disabled because after jumping out of a window on the first floor, one of her legs had to be amputated.

=== Romania ===
The Anti-Fascist Committee of German Workers in Romania was an organization for ethnic Germans in Romania. Emmerich Stoffel was the chairman of the Committee and Philipp Geltz its secretary. The committee was based in Bucharest and published the newspaper Neuer Weg ('New Path'). By the late 1940s the post-Second World War wave of discriminations against the German minority in Romania had subdued. At its meeting in December 1948, the Political Bureau of the Central Committee of the Romanian Workers Party adopted a 'Resolution of the National Question' which outlined the need for the formation of a German Anti-Fascist Committee and a German-language newspaper. The Anti-Fascist Committee of German Workers in Romania was founded in March 1949 by a number of ethnic German party members, along with its organ Neuer Weg.

=== United Kingdom ===
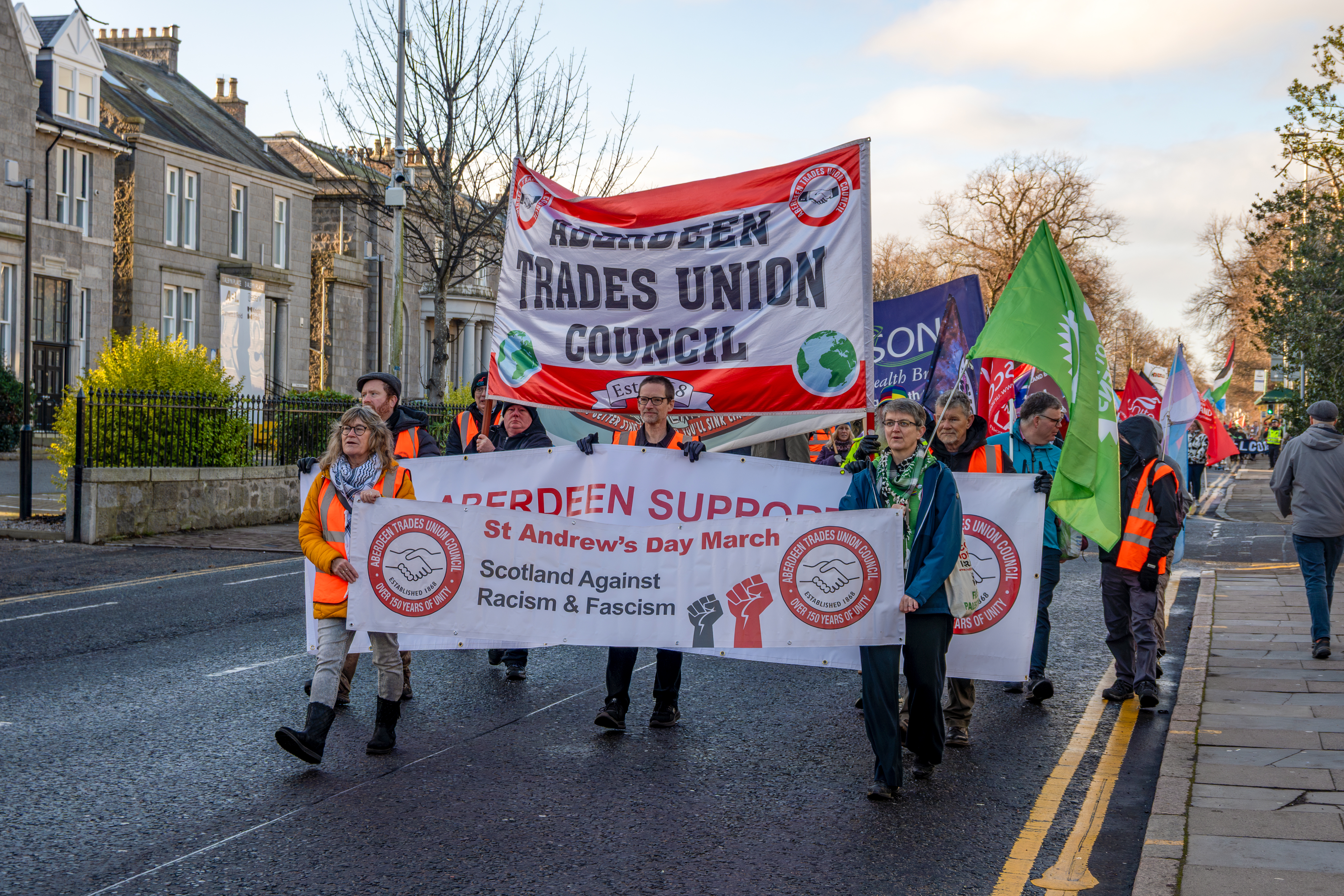
Anti-fascist march in Aberdeen, Scotland on 28 November 2025

After World War II, Jewish war veterans in the 43 Group continued the tradition of militant confrontations with Oswald Mosley's Union Movement. In the 1960s, the 62 Group continued the struggle against neo-Nazis.

In the 1970s, fascist and far-right parties such as the National Front (NF) and British Movement (BM) were making significant gains electorally, and were increasingly bold in their public appearances. This was challenged in 1977 with the Battle of Lewisham, when thousands of people disrupted an NF march in South London. Soon after, the Anti-Nazi League (ANL) was launched by the Socialist Workers Party (SWP). The ANL had a large-scale propaganda campaign and squads that attacked NF meetings and paper sales. The success of the ANL's campaigns contributed to the end of the NF's period of growth. During this period, there were also a number of black-led anti-fascist organizations, including the Campaign Against Racism and Fascism (CARF) and local groups like the Newham Monitoring Project.

The SWP disbanded the ANL in 1981, but many squad members refused to stop their activities. They were expelled from the SWP in 1981, many going on to found Red Action. The SWP used the term squadism to dismiss these militant anti-fascists as thugs. In 1985, some members of Red Action and the anarcho-syndicalist Direct Action Movement launched Anti-Fascist Action (AFA). Their founding document said "we are not fighting Fascism to maintain the status quo but to defend the interests of the working class".

Thousands of people took part in AFA mobilizations, such as Remembrance Day demonstrations in 1986 and 1987, the Unity Carnival, the Battle of Cable Street's 55th anniversary march in 1991, and the Battle of Waterloo against Blood and Honour in 1992. After 1995, some AFA mobilizations still occurred, such as against the NF in Dover in 1997 and 1998. However, AFA wound down its national organization and some of its branches and had ceased to exist nationally by 2001.

There was a surge in fascist activity across Europe from 1989 to 1992 after the collapse of Communism. In 1991, the Campaign Against Fascism in Europe (CAFE) coordinated a large militant protest against the visit to London by French right-wing leader, Jean-Marie Le Pen. This sparked a surge in anti-fascist organizations throughout Europe. In the UK alone, in 1992 a number of left-wing groups formed anti-fascist front organizations, such as a re-launched ANL in 1992, the Socialist Party's Youth against Racism in Europe YRE, and the Revolutionary Communist Party's Workers Against Racism. A number of black-led organizations, along with the Labour Party Black Sections and the National Black Caucus, formed the Anti-Racist Alliance in 1991, which eventually became the National Assembly Against Racism.

The magazine Searchlight was founded in 1975. The group founded Hope not Hate in 2004, which became independent in 2011.

In August 2018, the Shadow Chancellor John McDonnell called for a revival of "an Anti-Nazi League-type cultural and political campaign" following a number of far-right and racist incidents in the UK, including fascist attacks on a socialist bookshop by members of the far-right and UKIP, marches in favor of far-right activist Tommy Robinson and high-profile Islamophobia in the Conservative Party.

=== Sweden ===
2007 photo of Antifa graffiti in Trnava, Slovakia

Militant anti-fascism emerged in Sweden in the early 1990s, in particular around the yearly November 30 protests in Lund and Stockholm propelled by blockades of neo-Nazi marches in both cities in 1991. The main militant antifascist group in the country was the Antifascistisk Aktion (AFA), founded in Sweden in 1993 with as many as 20 branches in the late 1990s. It was inspired by a group with the same name that had started in Copenhagen in 1991 and British groups with similar names from the 1980s. The early tactics mainly focused on large demonstrations, in particular blockades of marches inspired by the 30th November events in Lund between 1991 and 1993. In parts of Sweden where these actions were less anchored in memory culture, a more territorial repertoire of interpersonal violence instead dominated, particular in the late 1990s. It was in this period that AFA published a detailed Activity Guide describing tactical uses of violence against neo-Nazis. In the early 2000s Antifascist Action split, with the now defunct, more Marxist and Workerkist Revolutionära Fronten (The Revolutionary Front) forming out of remnants of its Gothenburg, Stockholm and Örebro branches. Since the late 2000s the type of militant street-based antifascism that AFA and Revolutionära Fronten represented has declined, in response to a more parliamentarian and online focus in the far right. This is evident by the very limited public role in many of the largest antifascist demonstrations in the 2010s, including the large 2018 Gothenburg blockade of the Nordic Resistance Movement, the massive Kärrtorp protest, and the massive 13.000 person strong demonstration in 2014 in response to the stabbing of Showan Shattak and three other antifascists in Malmö.

=== Ukraine ===
During the Russian invasion of Ukraine, many anti-fascists have fought to defend Ukraine against Russia, which they regard as an imperialist and fascistic state under Vladimir Putin (see Ruscism and Putinism). They founded the Resistance Committee, an anti-fascist unit of Ukraine's Territorial Defense Forces. One of its most prominent members was anarchist Dmitry Petrov. Another Ukrainian anti-fascist activist, Maksym Butkevych, fought Russian forces before being captured and held as a prisoner of war; Russian state media denounced him as a "Nazi".

A network of anti-fascist groups in Ukraine and Europe, the Solidarity Collectives, was set up to gather equipment to send to comrades fighting Russian forces.

The Combat Organization of Anarcho-Communists is an anti-fascist militant group which is part of the Russian and Belarusian partisan movement. It supports Ukrainian resistance and opposes the Russian invasion by sabotaging railways and communications masts, and attacking army enlistment offices.

== Asia ==
=== Kashmir ===
In 2019, the Indian government revocated the special status of Jammu and Kashmir in the disputed Jammu and Kashmir state.

The lockdown and protests which followed led to the creation of militant groups like the People's Anti-Fascist Front.

=== Japan ===
In 2013, when Counter-Racist Action Collective (C.R.A.C.), which had been counter-acting against the conservative group Zaitokukai, began to denounce Prime Minister Shinzo Abe as a "fascist," groups calling themselves "Antifa" appeared around them. In addition to Tokyo, Antifa also have appeared in Hokkaido, Shizuoka, Aichi, and Hiroshima prefectures. They then promoted the Democratic Party's presidential election and participated in "Abe Out" demonstrations with liberals and opposition members of the Japanese Communist Party and the Constitutional Democratic Party of Japan.

In 2020, the activities of Antifa increased. In February, those waving the flag of Antifa were identified among those who were counter-acting against Zaitokukai. In May, Antifa also participated in the protest against the Abe Cabinet's coronavirus measures. In the protest, a foreign man was holding the Antifa flag, which was written in German as "ANTIFASCHISTSCHE AKTION." On May 17, Antifa was among the organizers of a nationwide protest against the revision of the Public prosecutor's office Law. When George Floyd protests occurred in the U.S. at the end of May, protest of "Black Lives Matter" were held in Tokyo and Osaka in June, and Antifa was also seen. On May 30 and June 6, Antifa and others led the protest against the hate crime by the police around the Shibuya Police Department. George Floyd protests were also held at the same time, and many foreigners and opposition members of the Diet also participated in the protests. Antifa's flag was raised, and there were arrests in the fight. The incident began when a Kurdish man in Japan claimed to have been unfairly questioned by Metropolitan Police officers and subjected to violence. Mainichi Shimbun and Kyodo News reported this as a hate crime though the Metropolitan Police denied. On June 10, the General Information Center for Foreign Residents of immigration bureaus across Japan received a "bomb threat" e-mail from a person claiming to be "Antifa" targeting the Immigration Bureau and the Shibuya Police Department for abusing foreigners. However, on June 13, the Japanese Kurdish Cultural Association, which consists of Kurds, expressed a negative view of the protest claims on their official Facebook page. The association declared that they did not support the protest and did not take any part in it, and abandoned the said person, saying there was no room to defend his actions in light of Japanese laws and customs. And the association announced that the demonstrators were not all involved in their usual protests against the crackdown on the Kurds or in their support activities. They said that a less-than-justified demonstration like this seems to have encouraged prejudice against Kurdish residents in Japan. They also said it's strange that no Japanese major media have covered them at all on this matter.

=== Myanmar ===
On October 15, 2024, the Anti-Fascist Internationalist Front formed to train Chin rebels to fight against the Myanmar State Administration Council military junta. A co-founder, who goes by Azad, once volunteered with Kurdish forces in Syria.

== United States ==
After World War II, but prior to the development of the modern antifa movement, violent confrontations with Fascist elements happened sporadically in the United States. In 1958, over 500 Lumbee men armed with rocks, sticks and firearms attacked and disrupted a Ku Klux Klan rally, wounding several Klansmen in an event known as the Battle of Hayes Pond. In 1979 the Maoist Communist Workers' Party confronted a local Ku Klux Klan chapter, first by disrupting a screening of The Birth of a Nation in China Grove, North Carolina and later organizing a rally and a march against the Klan on November 3 called the "Death to the Klan March" by the CWP.

The Maoists distributed flyers that "called for radical, even violent opposition to the Klan", suggesting the Klan "should be physically beaten and chased out of town." In response, as the marchers collected, a caravan of ten cars (and a van) filled with an estimated 40 KKK and American Nazi Party members confronted the protesters, culminating in a shootout known as the Greensboro Massacre.

In the 2010s, self-described antifa groups have become increasingly active in Western Europe and North America. These loose collectives first arose in the early 2010s in response to growing nationalism in countries including the United States, United Kingdom, Denmark, Germany, and France. In the US, anti-fascist groups had existed since at least 1988 in the form of the Anti-Racist Action, but an American movement using the same name has become increasingly active since 2016, often affiliated with anarchism, and have become known for their clashes with far-right and alt-right groups.

US anti-fascist activities have included violent disruptions and demonstrations which have drawn criticism from both sides of the mainstream political spectrum. Through their anarchist and anti-nationalist orientation, antifa groups have sometimes been linked to the punk subculture (including straight edge) both in the US and in Europe.

== Syrian Civil War ==
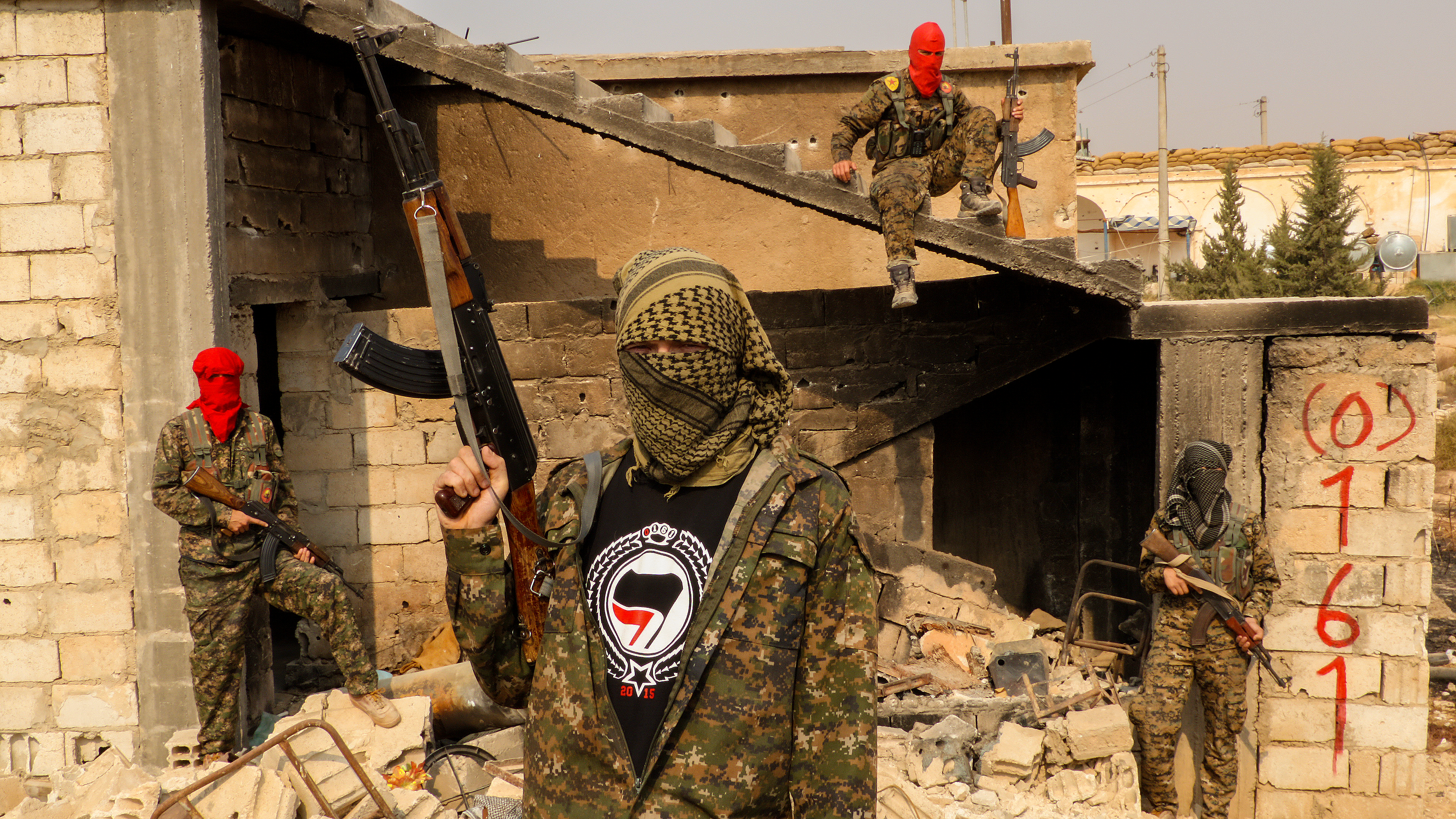
British fighters of the International Freedom Battalion's 0161 Antifa Manchester Crew in Rojava

Hundreds of foreign Antifa leftists have joined the International Freedom Battalion (founded in 2015) of the People's Protection Units (YPG) in the region called Rojava by Kurdish militias, in the North and East of Syria, out of a mixture of opposition to the Islamic State during the Syrian Civil War and willingness to defend what they call "Rojava Revolution" against the Turkish military and the Syrian Arab Republic. The Leon Sedov Brigade adopted the Antifa symbol as their logo and consisted of Argentine Trotskyists. It rejected Royava for being too close to Assad and the "Stalinist" PKK.

== Gallery ==
Logo of Antifaschistische Aktion (1930s; Germany)

Logo of Antifaschistische Aktion (Germany)

Toilet brush symbol adopted for the Hamburg protests of the German Antifa, 2014

Logo of Antifascistische Aktie (Netherlands)

Polish logo of Akcja Antyfaszystowska

Antifascist Action logo seen in US

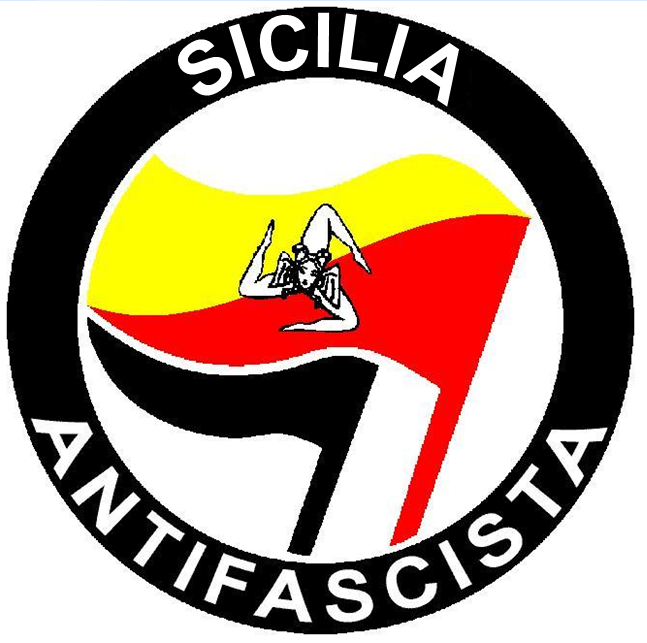
Logo of Sicilia Antifascista (Sicily)

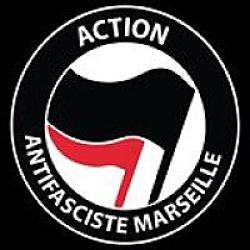
Logo of Action Antifasciste Marseille (Marseille)

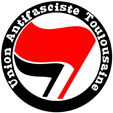
Logo of Union Antifasciste Toulousaine (Toulouse)

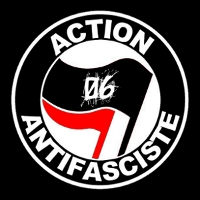
Logo of Action Antifasciste 06 (France)

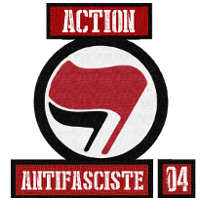
Logo of Action Antifasciste 04 (France)

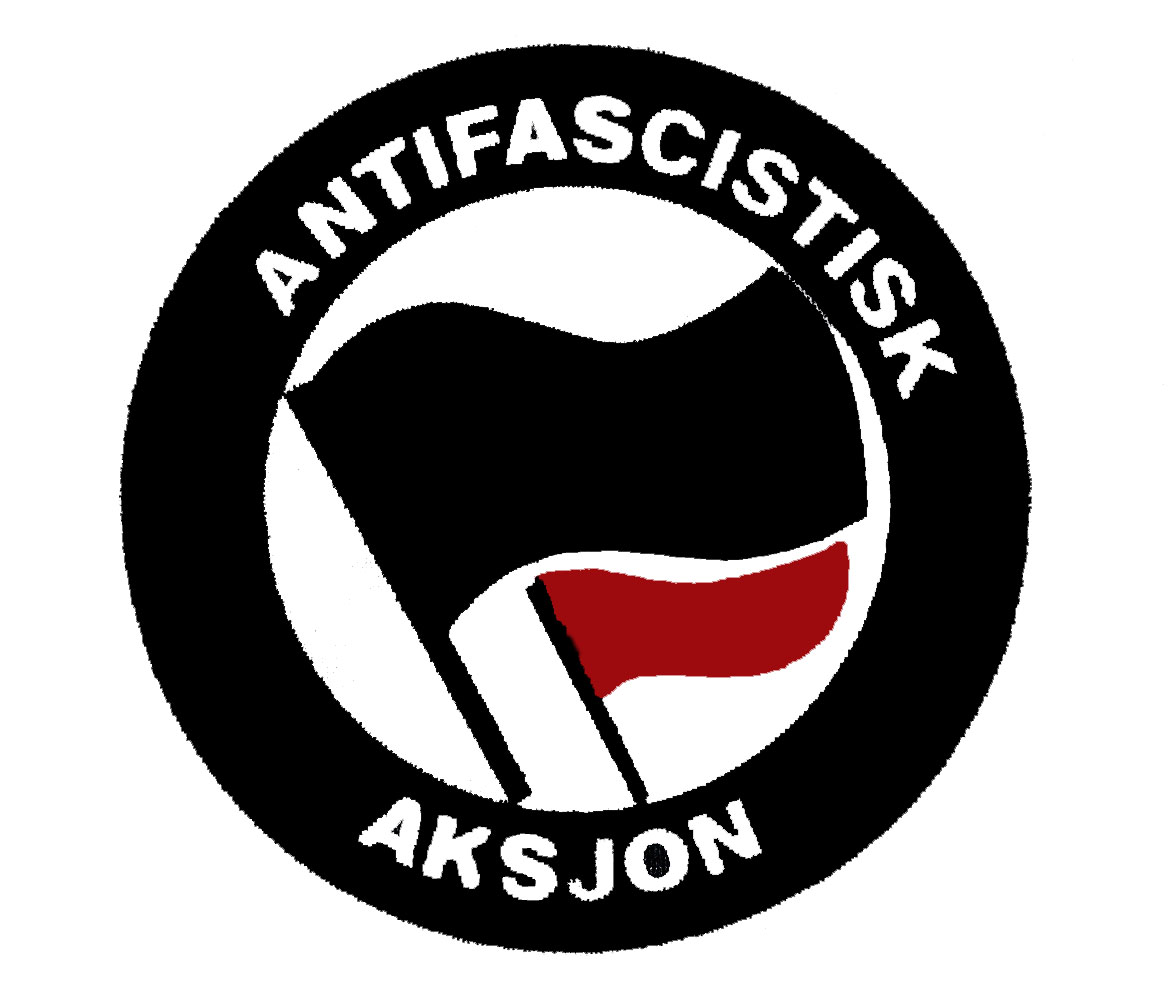
Logo of Antifascistisk Aksjon (Norway)

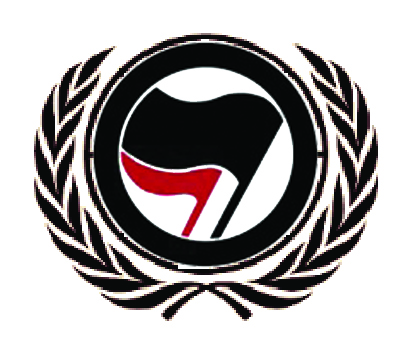
Logo of Antifa London (London)

Logo of Acción Antifascista (Spain)

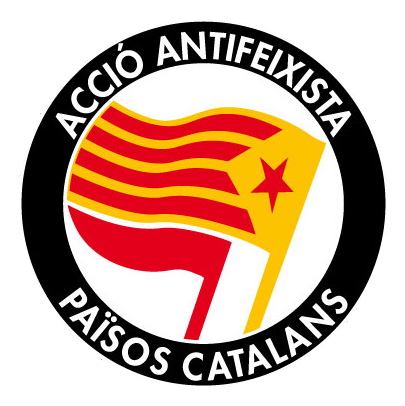
Logo of Acció Antifeixista (Catalan Countries)

The Three Arrows symbol is commonly used in the US antifa movement

== See also ==
- Black bloc
- Diversity of tactics
