= Conny Wessmann =

German activist (1965–1989)

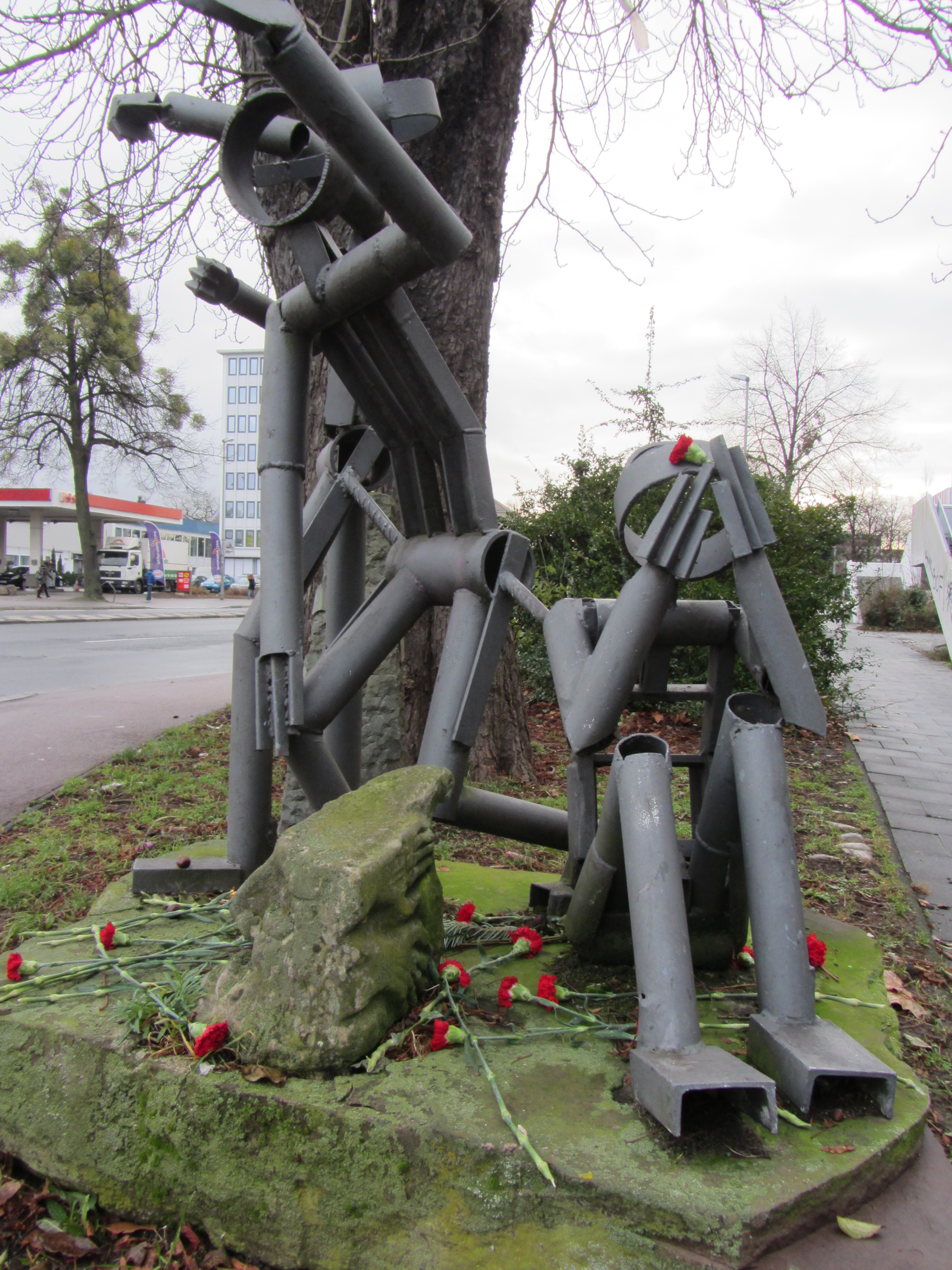
Memorial at the Weender Landstraße, the place of her death (2014)

Cornelia "Conny" Wessmann was a 24-year-old student who died on 17 November 1989, during a police raid in Göttingen, West Germany.

== Events ==
On that day, neo-Nazis rioted in the city centre of Göttingen. At that time, it was often the case that neo-Nazis attacked left-wing institutions or refugee centres. Antifa groups and other people tried to stop the attacks of the Nazis by mobilizing people with telephone chains. Wessmann was part of such a group. When her group arrived at the scene, the neo-Nazis were already stopped by the police and brought out of town. The police then followed her group which planned to dissolve near the university campus. Close to the busy Weender Landstraße, the group was attacked by police forces. Trying to escape over the street, Wessmann was struck by a car and died.

== Aftermath ==
Left-wing groups then blamed the police because of the sudden attack at this dangerous location. The incident got some attention in the media and the Green Party put forward an inquiry in the Parliament of Lower Saxony. To the criticism of the police contributed the fact that the police discussed over radio before the raid whether they "flatten them" (German: plattmachen). The meaning of this term was debated in the period immediately after the death and into the investigation.

The official investigation concluded that neither the police nor the car driver could be held responsible for what happened that day.
