= Annual Report on the Protection of the Constitution =

The Annual Report on the Protection of the Constitution (German: Verfassungsschutzbericht) is an annual report on the activities of far right, far left, and Islamic extremist circles and on espionage activities in Germany.

Gathered on the basis of §16 of the Bundesverfassungsschutzgesetz, since 1968 the report has been published annually by the German Federal Ministry of the Interior on behalf of its domestic intelligence agency, the Federal Office for the Protection of the Constitution (Bundesamt für Verfassungsschutz). While the state-level counterparts, the State Offices for the Protection of the Constitution (Landesbehörden für Verfassungsschutz) contribute to the federal annual report, most federal states publish their individual annual reports for their regional area of responsibility.
