= Antonia Grunenberg =

German political scientist

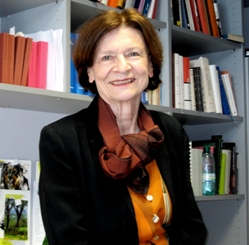
- Grunenberg
- Born: 2 May 1944 (age 82); Dresden
- Education: Free University of Berlin
- Scientific career
- Fields: Political science
- Workplaces: University of Oldenburg
- Thesis: Der Zusammenhang zwischen Linksradikalismus und Geschichtsphilosophie in Praxis und Theorie von Georg Lukacs (1918–1928) (1975)

Antonia Grunenberg (born 2 May 1944) is a German political scientist, totalitarianism researcher and an expert on the political thought of Hannah Arendt. She is professor emerita at the University of Oldenburg, where she taught as a full professor from 1998 until her 2009 retirement, and where she was director of the Hannah Arendt Centre. She is also editor of the book series Hannah Arendt Studies.

Grunenberg earned her doctorate in philosophy at the Free University of Berlin in 1975 and a habilitation in political science at RWTH Aachen University in 1986.

Grunenberg was appointed by the federal government as a member of the scientific committee of the Federal Foundation for the Reappraisal of the SED Dictatorship in 2006.

== Bibliography ==
- Der Zusammenhang zwischen Linksradikalismus und Geschichtsphilosophie in Praxis und Theorie von Georg Lukacs (1918–1928), 1975
- Hannah Arendt, Martin Heidegger und Karl Jaspers. Denken im Schatten des Traditionsbruchs. In: Hannah Arendt: Verborgene Tradition – Unzeitgemäße Aktualität? Hrsg. Heinrich-Böll-Stiftung, Berlin 2007, ISBN 978-3-05-004389-0
- Hannah Arendt und Martin Heidegger. Geschichte einer Liebe., München and Zürich, 2006, ISBN 3-492-04490-5
- Hannah Arendt. In der Reihe Meisterdenker Spektrum, Freiburg 2003, ISBN 3-451-04954-6
- Der Schlaf der Freiheit. Politik und Gemeinsinn im 21. Jahrhundert. Reinbek 2002, ISBN 3-498-02477-9
- Die Lust an der Schuld. Von der Macht der Vergangenheit über die Gegenwart. Berlin: Rowohlt, 2001. ISBN 3-87134-389-7.
- Antifaschismus – Ein deutscher Mythos. Rowohlt Verlag, Reinbek 1993. ISBN 349913179X
- Aufbruch der inneren Mauer. Politik und Kultur in der DDR 1971–1989. Edition Temmen, 1990, ISBN 3-926958-44-8
