= Antifaschistische Aktion =

German far-left militant group

"Come to us", 1932 poster

Antifaschistische Aktion (German pronunciation: [ˌantifaˈʃɪstɪʃə ʔakˈtsi̯oːn], lit. 'Antifascist Action') was an anti-fascist organisation in the Weimar Republic, that was founded and controlled by the Communist Party of Germany (KPD). Formed in 1932, Antifaschistische Aktion opposed pro-Nazi paramilitary forces, such as the Sturmabteilung (SA), until its dissolution in 1933. The group's KPD leadership strongly opposed the Social Democratic Party of Germany (SPD), although local Antifaschistische Aktion groups worked with SPD activists.

In the postwar era, the historical organisation has inspired new groups and networks, including the German antifa movement, many of which use the aesthetics of Antifaschistische Aktion, especially the antifa moniker and logo.

== Background ==
The late 1920s and early 1930s saw rising tensions mainly between three broad groups, the Communist Party of Germany (KPD) on one side, the Nazi Party a second, and a coalition of governing parties, mainly social democrats, conservatives and liberals, making up a third side. Berlin in particular was the site of regular and often very violent clashes. The government banned demonstrations, which the Communists defied, leading to skirmishes with the police, while the Nazis attacked their political opponents, the Communists and Social Democrats, and actual or perceived Jewish citizens. As part of this struggle, all three factions organized their own paramilitary groups.

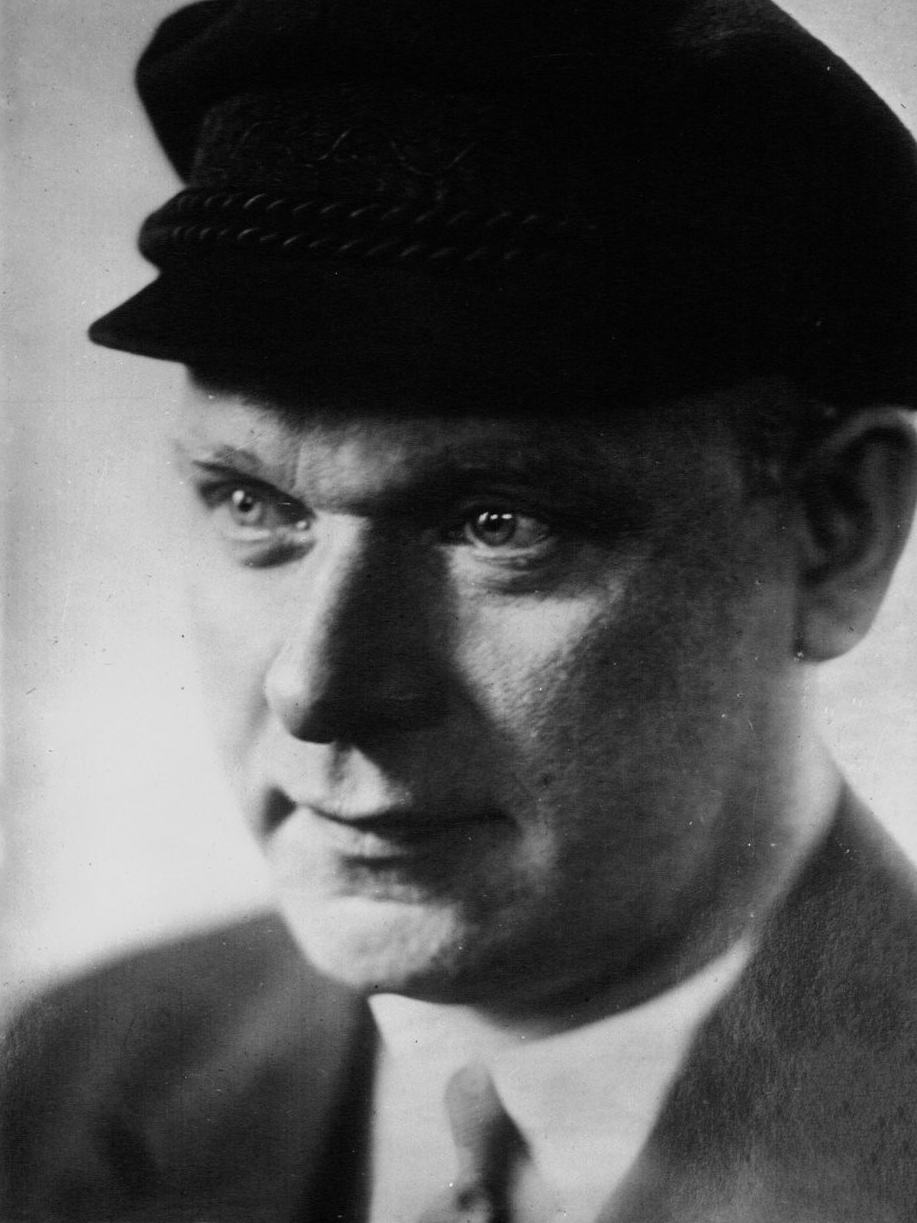
Under the leadership of Ernst Thälmann, the KPD became a Stalinist party and viewed the SPD as both its main adversary and as "social fascists".

Under the leadership of Ernst Thälmann, the KPD became a Stalinist party that was fiercely loyal to the Soviet government. Since 1928, the KPD was largely controlled and funded by the Soviet government through the Comintern. Up until 1928, the KPD pursued a united front policy of working with other working class and socialist parties to combat fascism. It was in this period, in 1924, that the Roter Frontkämpferbund ("Red Front Fighters League"; RFB), the KPD's paramilitary and propaganda organisation and first anti-fascist front, had been formed. The RFB was often involved in violent clashes with the police.

After the Communist International's abrupt turn in its Third Period from 1928, the KPD regarded the Social Democratic Party of Germany (SPD) as its main adversary and adopted the position that the SPD was the main fascist party in Germany. This was based on the theory of social fascism that had been proclaimed by Joseph Stalin and that was supported by the Comintern during the late 1920s and early 1930s, which held that social democracy was a variant of fascism.

Consequently, the KPD held that it was "the only anti-fascist party" in Germany and stated that "fighting fascism means fighting the SPD just as much as it means fighting Hitler and the parties of Brüning."

In 1929, the KPD's banned public May Day rally in Berlin was broken up by police; 33 people unrelated to the KPD were killed by police in the clash. The RFB was then banned as extremist by the governing Social Democrats. In 1930, the KPD established the RFB's de facto successor, known as Kampfbund gegen den Faschismus ("Fighting Alliance against Fascism"), which had 100,000 members by the end of the year. In late 1931, local Roter Massenselbstschutz ("Red Mass Self-Defence", RMSS), units were formed by Kampfbund members as autonomous and loosely organized structures under the leadership of, but outside the formal organization of the KPD as part of the party's united front policy to work with other working class groups to defeat "fascism" as interpreted by the party.

During the Third Period, the KPD viewed the Nazi Party ambiguously. On one hand, the KPD considered the Nazi Party to be one of the fascist parties. On the other hand, the KPD sought to appeal to nationalist voters by using nationalist slogans. According to Günter Fippel, the KPD sometimes cooperated with the Nazis in attacking the SPD. In 1931, the Nazis led an unsuccessful attempt to bring down the SPD state government of Prussia by a referendum calling for the dissolution of the Prussian Landtag; the KPD initially opposed it but later supported the referendum. In the usage of the Soviet Union —and of the Comintern and its affiliated parties in this period, including the KPD— the epithet fascist was used to describe capitalist society in general and virtually any anti-Soviet or anti-Stalinist activity or opinion.

The formation of Antifaschistische Aktion in 1932 indicated a shift away from the Third Period policies, as fascism came to be recognised as a more serious threat (the two red flags on its logo symbolized Communists in unity with socialists), leading up to the 1934 and 1935 adoption of a popular front policy of anti-fascist unity with non-Communist groups.

In October 1931, a coalition of right-wing and far-right parties established the Harzburg Front, which opposed the government of the Centre Party's Heinrich Brüning. In response, the SPD and affiliated group established the Iron Front to defend liberal democracy and the constitution of the Weimar Republic. Antifaschistische Aktion was formed partly as a counter-move to the SPD's establishment of the Iron Front, which the KPD regarded as a "social fascist terror organisation." However, from the mid-1930s, the term anti-fascist became ubiquitous in Soviet, Comintern, and KPD usage, as Communists who had been attacking democratic rivals were now told to change tack and engage in coalitions with them against the fascist threat.

== Establishment ==
The 1932 Unity Congress showing in the centre the logo flanked by Soviet banners, to the right imagery of the KPD fighting capitalism and to the left imagery attacking the SPD

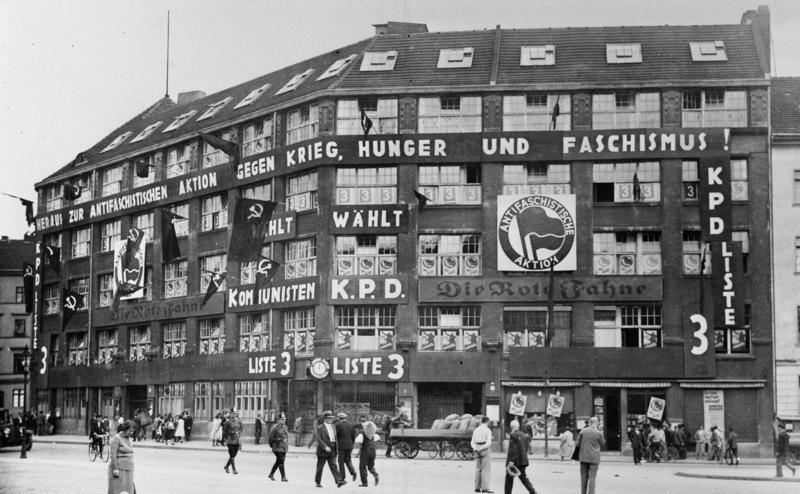
Karl-Liebknecht-Haus, the KPD's headquarters from 1926 to 1933 in which Antifaschistische Aktion' logo can be seen prominently displayed on the front of the building

After a brawl in the Landtag of Prussia between members of the Nazi Party and the KPD left eight people severely injured, the KPD under Thälmann's leadership reacted to the establishment of the Harzburg Front and the Iron Front with a call for their own Unity Front, which they shortly after renamed Antifaschistische Aktion.

On 26 May 1932, the KPD announced the establishment of Antifaschistische Aktion in the party's newspaper Die Rote Fahne (The Red Flag). The new organisation was based on the principle of a communist front, not a membership organisation, but it remained an integral part of the KPD. The KPD described Antifaschistische Aktion as a "red united front under the leadership of the only anti-fascist party, the KPD."

The organisation held its first rally in Berlin on 10 July 1932, then capital of the Weimar Republic. Its two-flag logo, designed by Association of Revolutionary Visual Artists members Max Gebhard and Max Keilson, remains a widely used symbol of militant anti-fascism.

How many people belonged to Antifaschistische Aktion is difficult to determine because there were no membership cards. Rather, it developed out of the practical participation. The Red Mass Self-Defence (RMSS) units were absorbed into Antifaschistische Aktion, forming the nuclei of the latter's Unity Committees, organised on a micro-local basis, e.g. in apartment buildings, factories or allotments.

== Activities ==
As well as being involved in political streetfights, the RMSS and Antifaschistische Aktion used their militant approach to develop a comprehensive network of self-defence for communities targeted by the Nazis such as in "tenant protection" (Mieterschutz), action against evictions. Initially, the RMSS units had minimal formal membership, but in the second half of 1932 local executive boards were created to co-ordinate the activities of the KPD, the Kampfbund, the RMSS and the now illegal Roter Frontkämpferbund, with the RMSS given a more distinct and almost paramilitary defence role, often co-operating on an ad hoc basis with the Reichsbanner. At a local level, Antifaschistische Aktion worked with other left groups, including joint assemblies and demonstrations with SPD and other socialist groups, but the national KPD leadership continued to describe social democracy as the "main enemy".

With Antifaschistische Aktion, the KPD not only wanted to create a cross-party collection movement dominated by KPD, but they also aimed specifically at the Reichstag election on 31 July 1932. The election campaign for the July election is regarded as the most violent in German history. In particular between KPD and Nazi supporters, it came to massive clashes and even shootings. After the forced dissolution in the wake of the Machtergreifung in 1933, the movement went underground.

== Legacy ==
In the postwar era, the historical Antifaschistische Aktion inspired a variety of different movements, groups and individuals in Germany as well as other countries which widely adopted variants of its aesthetics and some of its tactics. Known as the wider antifa movement, modern antifa groups have no direct organisational connection to Antifaschistische Aktion.

In 1944, groups called Antifaschistische Aktion, Antifaschistische Ausschüsse, or Antifaschistische Kommittees, all typically abbreviated to antifa, spontaneously re-emerged in Germany, mainly involving veterans of the pre-war KPD, KPO, and SPD. Some members of other democratic political parties and Christians who opposed the Nazi régime also participated. In 1945, the anti-fascist committee in the city of Olbernhau included "three Communists and three Social Democrats" while the antifascist committee in Leipzig "had nine members, including three liberals and progressive Christians."

In the American, British, and French zones, antifa groups began to recede by the late summer of 1945, marginalized by Allied bans on political organization and by re-emerging divisions within the movement between Communists and others. In East Germany, antifa groups were absorbed into the new Stalinist state. On 11 July 1945, the Soviets permitted the formation of the United Front of the Antifascist-Democratic Parties which included representatives from the "Communist KPD, the Social Democratic SPD, the Christian Democratic Union (CDU), and the Liberal Democratic Party (LDP)."

In the United States, antifa of the early 21st-century has drawn its aesthetics and some of its tactics from Antifaschistische Aktion.

== See also ==
- Anti-Germans (political current)
- German resistance to Nazism
