= Tim Peters (political scientist) =

German political scientist

Tim Peters (born 1973) is a German political scientist, lawyer and politician of the Christian Democratic Union of Germany (CDU). A resident of Belgium, he is an official of the Secretariat of the European Parliament. As a political scientist, he is known as a student of Eckhard Jesse in the tradition of German extremism research, and has published works on the political tradition of the former Party of Democratic Socialism. He was one of the leading figures within the Junge Union during the early 2000s and is currently chairman of the Brussels branch of the CDU, the party's only branch outside Germany. He ran unsuccessfully as a CDU candidate for the Bundestag in the 2005 German federal election.

== Early life ==
Peters was born in Hamburg, Germany.

== Career ==
Peters studied law at TU Dresden, Paris Nanterre University and the Humboldt University of Berlin; he obtained a French licence en droit in 1998 and passed the German first state examination in law in 2001. He worked for a law firm and in the office of the legal advisor of the CDU/CSU faction in the German Bundestag, Ronald Pofalla. He then studied political science and was affiliated with the Politischer Extremismus und Parteien research environment. He obtained his PhD with a dissertation on the anti-fascist tradition of the Party of Democratic Socialism, titled Der Antifaschismus der PDS: Ursachen und Wirkungen; his doctoral advisor was Eckhard Jesse. It was also published as a book by VS Verlag für Sozialwissenschaften under the title Der Antifaschismus der PDS aus antiextremistischer Sicht. He worked as a legal advisor in the Brussels office of General Electric and as a Rechtsreferendar with the Federal Ministry of Finance in Germany and the European Commission in Brussels, and passed his second state examination in law in 2007, fully qualifying as a lawyer. He has lived in Brussels since the early to mid 2000s; until 2012 he worked as an advisor for industrial policy in the Brussels office of the Confederation of Germany Industry and the Confederation of German Employers' Associations, the German Business Representation Brussels. He is now an official of the Secretariat of the European Parliament.

== Political activity ==
Peters joined the Junge Union in Hamburg at age 14, and later became the chairman of Junge Union in Berlin. He was also active in the Association of Christian Democratic Students. In 2000, he was elected as the "Internet Chancellor" by youth and students on the Internet platform dol2day; he ran as "General T".

In the 2005 German federal election he ran as a candidate for the CDU in Berlin, but was not elected. He founded the Brussels branch of the Junge Union and became chairman of CDU in Brussels in 2013.

== Selected bibliography ==
- Der Antifaschismus der PDS aus antiextremistischer Sicht (= Forschung Politik). With a preface by Eckhard Jesse. VS Verlag für Sozialwissenschaften, Wiesbaden 2006, ISBN 3-531-14775-7
