= Feminism in Germany =

Feminism in Germany as a modern movement began during the Wilhelmine period (1888–1918) with individual women and women's rights groups pressuring a range of traditional institutions, from universities to government, to open their doors to women. This movement culminated in women's suffrage in 1919. Later waves of feminist activists pushed to expand women's rights.

== History ==
=== Medieval period to Early Modern era ===
The status of women varied, depending on regions and eras. Ottonian sources rate the value of women just as highly as men, except when it comes to physical power. The Saxon tradition assigned women an equal role in the family, which contributed to the powerful roles empresses and abbesses held in the Ottonian era.

Feminism in Germany has its earliest roots in the lives of women who challenged conventional gender roles as early as the medieval period.

Salic (Frankish) law, from which the laws of the German lands would be based, placed women at a disadvantage with regard to property and inheritance rights. Germanic widows required a male guardian to represent them in court. Unlike Anglo-Saxon law or the Visigothic Code, Salic law barred women from royal succession. Social status was based on military and biological roles, a reality demonstrated in rituals associated with newborns, when female infants were given a lesser value than male infants. The use of physical force against wives was condoned until the 18th century in Bavarian law.

Some women of means asserted their influence during the Middle Ages, typically in royal court or convent settings. Hildegard of Bingen, Gertrude the Great, Elisabeth of Bavaria (1478–1504), and Argula von Grumbach are among the women who pursued independent accomplishments in fields as diverse as medicine, musical composition, religious writing, and government and military politics.

The historian and playwright Hrosvitha is sometimes considered the first feminist.

=== Enlightenment and early 19th century ===
Legal recognition of women's rights in Germany came more slowly than in some other countries, such as England, France, the United States, or Canada. The equal rights of parents under German law did not arrive until the German Federal Republic in the 20th century; the German Civil Code introduced in 1900 had left the law unaltered in the matter, basing it precisely on the General state laws for the Prussian states of 1794. Property rights were also slow to change. During the late 19th century, married women still had no property rights, requiring a male guardian to administer property on their behalf (exceptions were made for cases involving imprisoned or absent husbands). Any woman who had inherited an artisan business had some freedom in practice to run the business, but she was not permitted to attend guild meetings, and had to send a male to represent her interests. Tradition dictated that "the state recognizes a burgher but not a burgess".

The Age of Enlightenment brought a consciousness of feminist thought to England and France, most influentially in the works of Mary Wollstonecraft. This was a development that lagged in German-speaking regions. Where upper-class women were literate in England and France and sometimes became prolific writers of feminist works, a network of feminist writers and activists was slow to emerge in what would become modern Germany. Many reasons have been considered as having a bearing upon this dilemma, from fractured regions, to the lack of a capital city, to the slow spread of novels and other literary forms in German-speaking areas. Women with literary talent were more likely to work in relative isolation, yet they left a legacy of letters and memoirs that gained a new popularity as the nostalgic Kulturgeschichte (culture history) trend in the first decades of the 20th century.

Feminist ideas still began to spread, and some radical women became outspoken in promoting the cause of women's rights. Sophie Mereau launched the Almanach für Frauen (Women's Almanac) in 1784. Feminism as a movement began to gain ground toward the end of the 19th century, although it did not yet include a strong push to extend suffrage to German women. Some women who worked for women's rights were in fact opposed to extending the vote to women, a stance that became more widespread at the turn of the 20th century, when many Germans were concerned that granting women the vote would result in more votes for socialists.

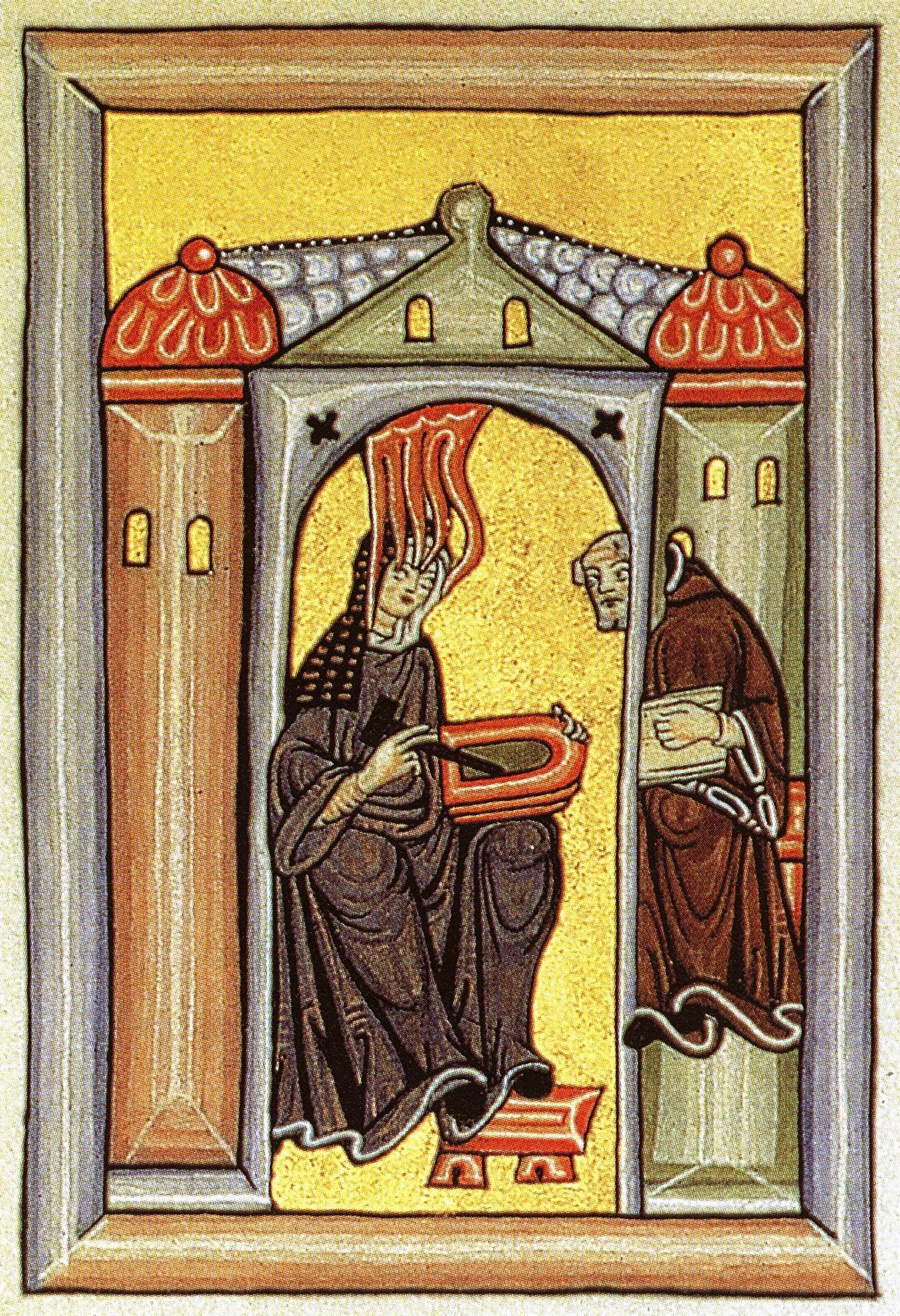
Hildegard of Bingen, Medieval religious and medical writer and polymath

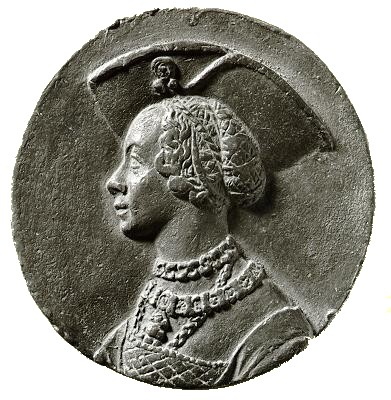
Argula von Grumbach, Protestant Reformation movement figure

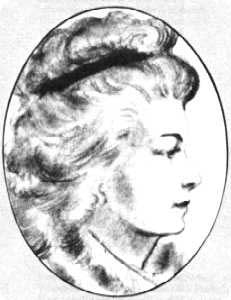
Sophie Mereau, Age of Enlightenment writer

=== Wilhelmine Germany ===
Germany's unification process after 1871 was heavily dominated by men and gave priority to the "Fatherland" theme and related male issues, such as military prowess. Nevertheless, women became much better organized themselves. Middle class women enrolled in the Bund Deutscher Frauenvereine, the Union of German Feminist Organizations (BDF). Founded in 1894, it grew to include 137 separate women's rights groups from 1907 until 1933, when the Nazi regime disbanded the organization.

The BDF gave national direction to the proliferating women's organizations that had sprung up since the 1860s. From the beginning the BDF was a bourgeois organization, its members working toward equality with men in such areas as education, financial opportunities, and political life. Working-class women were not welcome; they were organized by the Socialists.

Formal organizations for promoting women's rights grew in numbers during the Wilhelmine period. German feminists began to network with feminists from other countries, and participated in the growth of international organizations; Marie Stritt was active as a feminist leader not only in Germany but with the International Woman Suffrage Alliance (IWSA). Stritt met the radical feminists Anita Augspurg (Germany's first woman university graduate) and Minna Cauer, and became a supporter of the Women's Legal Aid Society. Stritt's goals included suffrage for women, access to higher education, an end to state-regulated prostitution, free access to contraception and abortion, and reforms to divorce laws. Stritt was active as a member and leader in many German feminist organizations during the late 19th century and early 20th century, including:

- League for the Protection of Motherhood and Social Reform
- Reform
- Federation of German Women's Associations (FGWA)

The FGWA had been moderate in its positions until 1902, then launched a campaign to reform the civil code, but the campaign failed to bring about any changes. Stritt found herself on the radical edge of Germany's feminist movement, spearheading the German Association for Women's Suffrage from 1911 until it disbanded in 1919, having achieved the goal of women's suffrage in November of that year.

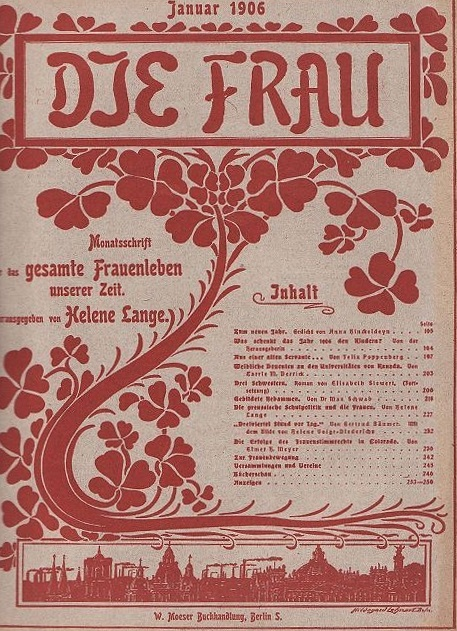
Die Frau magazine, January 1906, published by the feminist umbrella organization Bund Deutscher Frauenvereine (BDF)

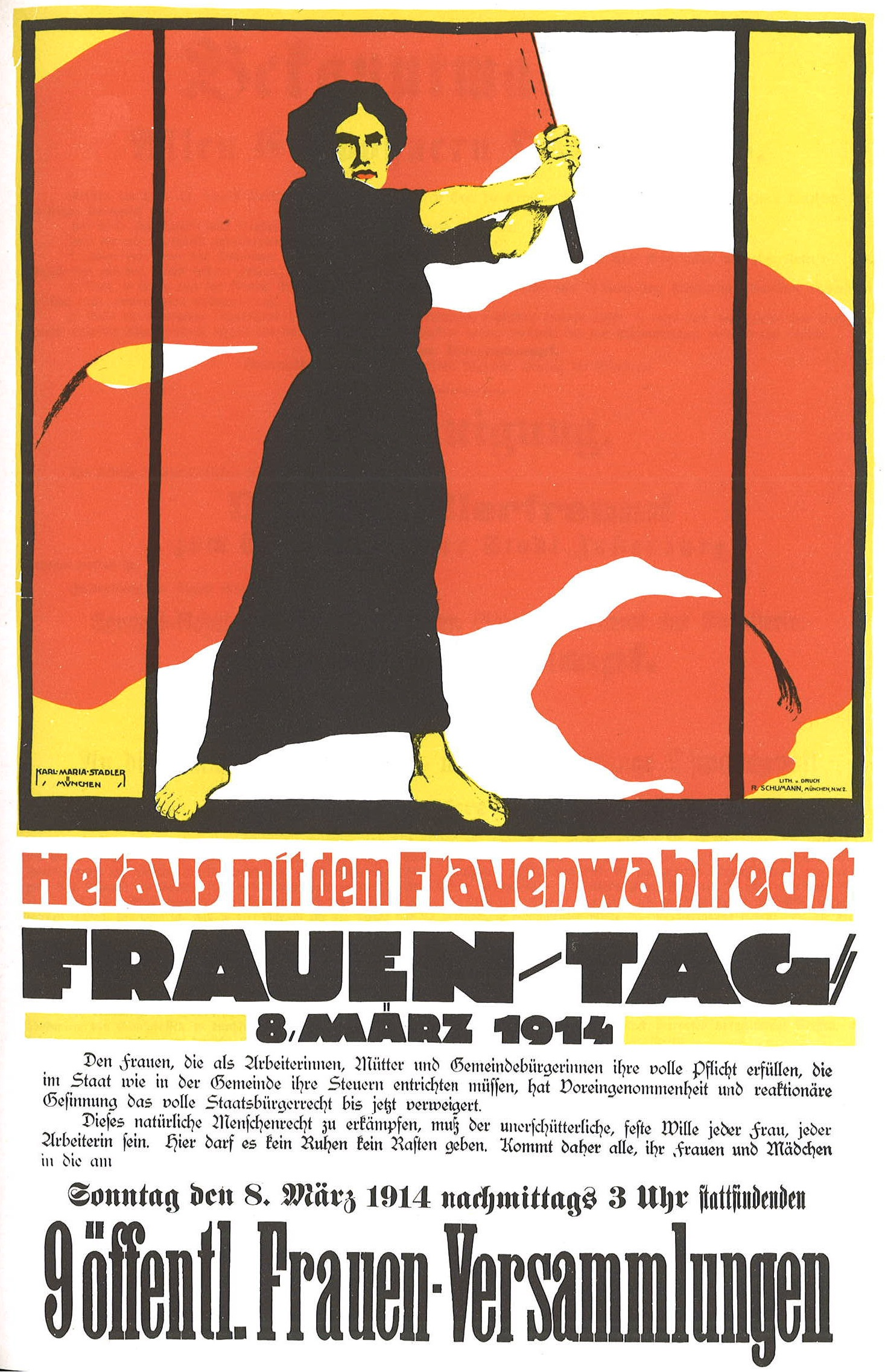
Poster for International Women's Day, March 8, 1914. Claiming voting rights for women.

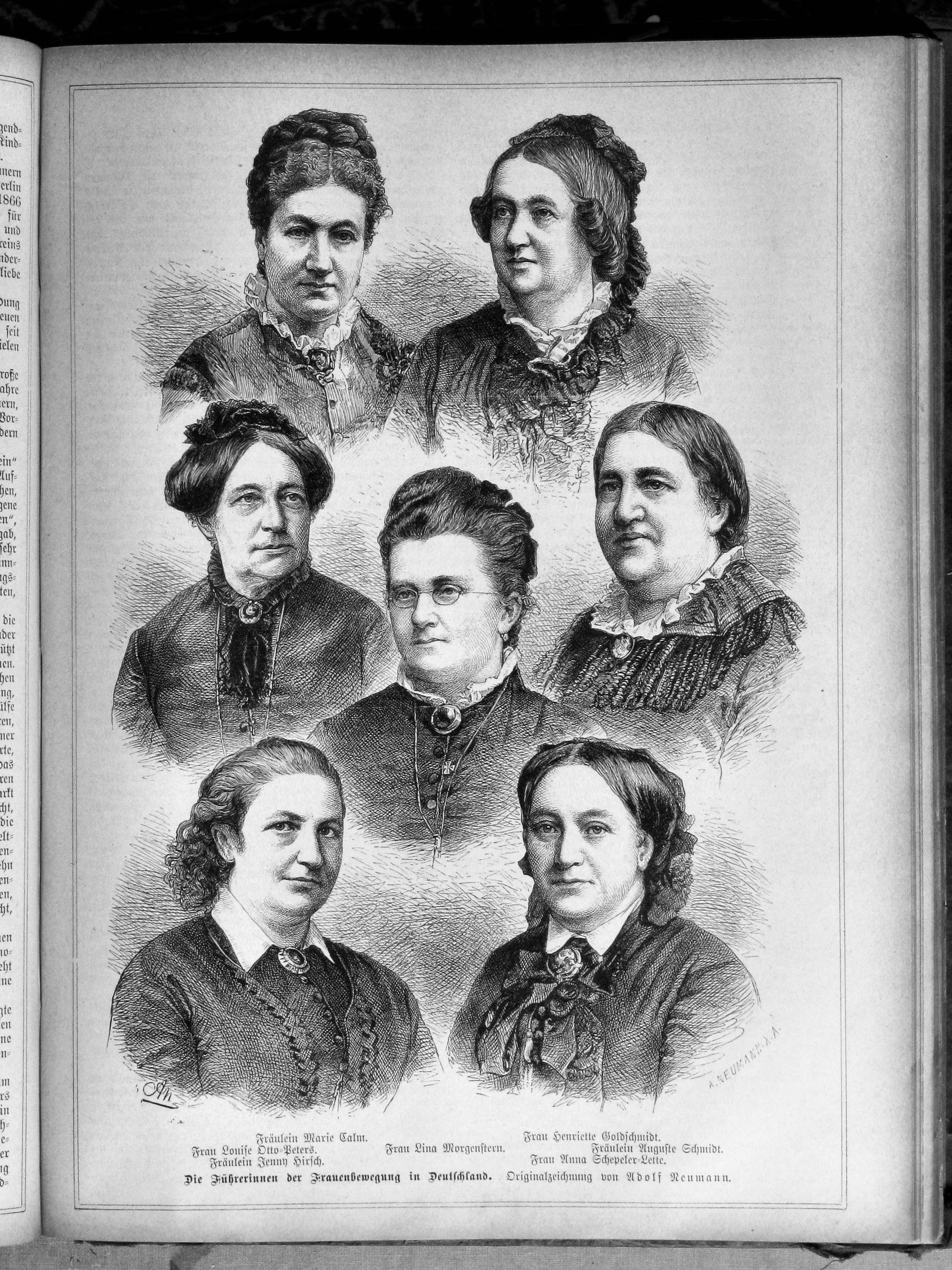
An 1883 illustration of several prominent feminists, including Marie Calm, Luise Otto-Peters, Jenny Hirsch, Lina Morgenstern, Henriette Goldschmidt, Auguste Schmidt, and Anna Schepeler-Lette

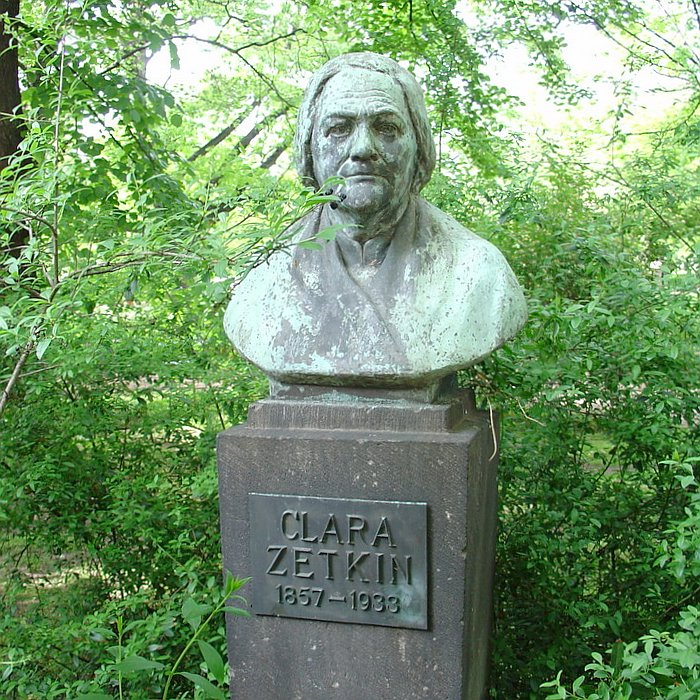
A bust of Clara Zetkin in Dresden, Germany. Zetkin was a member of the Reichstag, and co-founded International Women's Day.

Socialist feminists were active in promoting the rights of working-class women. Socialist, communist, and social democratic organizations had feminist members, who promoted women's rights with mixed success. During the rise of nationalism in this era, one Fascist organization that was vocally anti-feminist was the German National Association of Commercial Employees (Deutschnationaler Handlungsgehilfenverband, or DHV), which promoted the interests of the merchant class. There was little opportunity for feminists of the working class and feminists of the middle or upper classes to work together. The expansion of Germany's industrial economy during the 1890s and up to World War I had brought more women into the labour force. However, cooperation between the social classes was "unfeasible" at the time.

Women's emancipation was attained despite pressure from The German League for the Prevention of Women's Emancipation, which numbered several hundred supporters and was active beginning in 1912, disbanding in 1920. The antifeminist sentiment among some Germans reflected a variety of arguments against women's emancipation:

The arguments against women's emancipation varied but often included sentiments regarding the inferiority of women and women's subjugation to men as determined by God or by nature. More frequently and sometimes additionally, they included charges that a change in women's position in society would be morally wrong, against tradition, and would trigger a decline of the importance of the family. Such arguments sometimes surfaced as protective and paternalistic justifications, e.g., the desire to "shield" women from the public sphere.

Writer Hedwig Dohm gave some impetus to the feminist movement in Germany with her writings during the late 19th century, with her argument that women's roles were created by society rather than being a biological imperative. During this period, a wider range of feminist writings from other languages were being translated into German, deepening the feminist discourse further for German women.

==== Access to education ====
In Sex in Education, Or, A Fair Chance for Girls (1873), educator Edward H. Clarke researched educational standards in Germany. He found that by the 1870s, formal education for middle and upper-class girls was the norm in Germany's cities, although it ended at the onset of menarche, which typically happened when a girl was 15 or 16. After this, her education might continue at home with tutors or occasional lectures. Clarke concluded that "Evidently the notion that a boy's education and a girl's education should be the same, and that the same means the boy's, has not yet penetrated the German mind. This has not yet evolved the idea of the identical education of the sexes." Education for peasant girls was not formal, and they learned farming and housekeeping tasks from their parents. This prepared them for a life of harsh labour on the farm. On a visit to Germany, Clarke observed that:

"German peasant girls and women work in the field and shop with and like men. None who have seen their stout and brawny arms can doubt the force with which they wield the hoe and axe. I once saw, in the streets of Coblentz, a woman and a donkey yoked to the same cart, while a man, with a whip in his hand, drove the team. The bystanders did not seem to look upon the moving group as if it were an unusual spectacle.

Young middle class and upper-class women began to pressure their families and the universities to allow them access to higher education. Anita Augspurg, the first woman university graduate in Germany, graduated with a law degree from the University of Zurich, Switzerland. Several other German women, unable to gain admittance to German universities, also went to the University of Zurich to continue their education. In 1909, German universities finally allowed women to gain admittance—but women graduates were unable to practice their profession, as they were "barred from private practice and public administrative posts for lawyers". The first women's legal aid agency was established by Marie Stritt in 1894; by 1914, there were 97 such legal aid agencies, some employing women law graduates.

=== Weimar Germany ===
Following women's enfranchisement, women's rights made significant gains in Germany during the Weimar Republic. The Weimar Constitution of 1919 enacted equality in education for the sexes, equal opportunity in civil service appointments, and equal pay in the professions. These changes put Germany in the group of advanced countries in terms of women's legal rights (Czechoslovakia, Iceland, Lithuania and the Soviet Union also had no distinction between the sexes in the professions, while countries such as France, Belgium, the Netherlands, Italy, and Norway held onto restrictions to the professions for women throughout the inter-war period). Germany's Reichstag had 32 women deputies in 1926 (6.7% of the Reichstag), giving women representation at the national level that surpassed countries such as Great Britain (2.1% of the House of Commons) and the United States (1.1% of the House of Representatives); this climbed to 35 women deputies in the Reichstag in 1933 on the eve of the Nazi dictatorship, when Great Britain still had only 15 women members in the House of Commons.

The umbrella group of feminist organizations, the Bund Deutscher Frauenvereine (BDF; Federation of German Women's Associations), remained the dominant force in German feminism during the inter-war period. It had around 300,000 members at the start of World War I, growing to over 900,000 members during the 1920s; it has been noted, however, that the middle-class membership was far from radical, and promoted maternal "clichés" and "bourgeois responsibilities". Other feminist groups were organized around religious faiths, and there were many Catholic, Protestant, and Jewish feminist groups.

Prominent feminists of this era included Helene Lange (founding BDF board member and women's suffrage activist who served in the Hamburg Senate), her life partner Gertrud Bäumer (writer and Reichstag delegate from 1919 to 1932), Helene Stöcker (pacifist, gender activist, writer and feminist journal editor), and Clara Zetkin (Marxist theorist, women's rights activist, and KPD Reichstag delegate from 1920 to 1933). The 1920s also saw the rise of the "New Woman" (Neue Frau), as portrayed by authors such as Elsa Herrmann (So ist die neue Frau, 1929) and Irmgard Keun (Das kunstseidene Mädchen, 1932, translated as The Artificial Silk Girl, 1933).

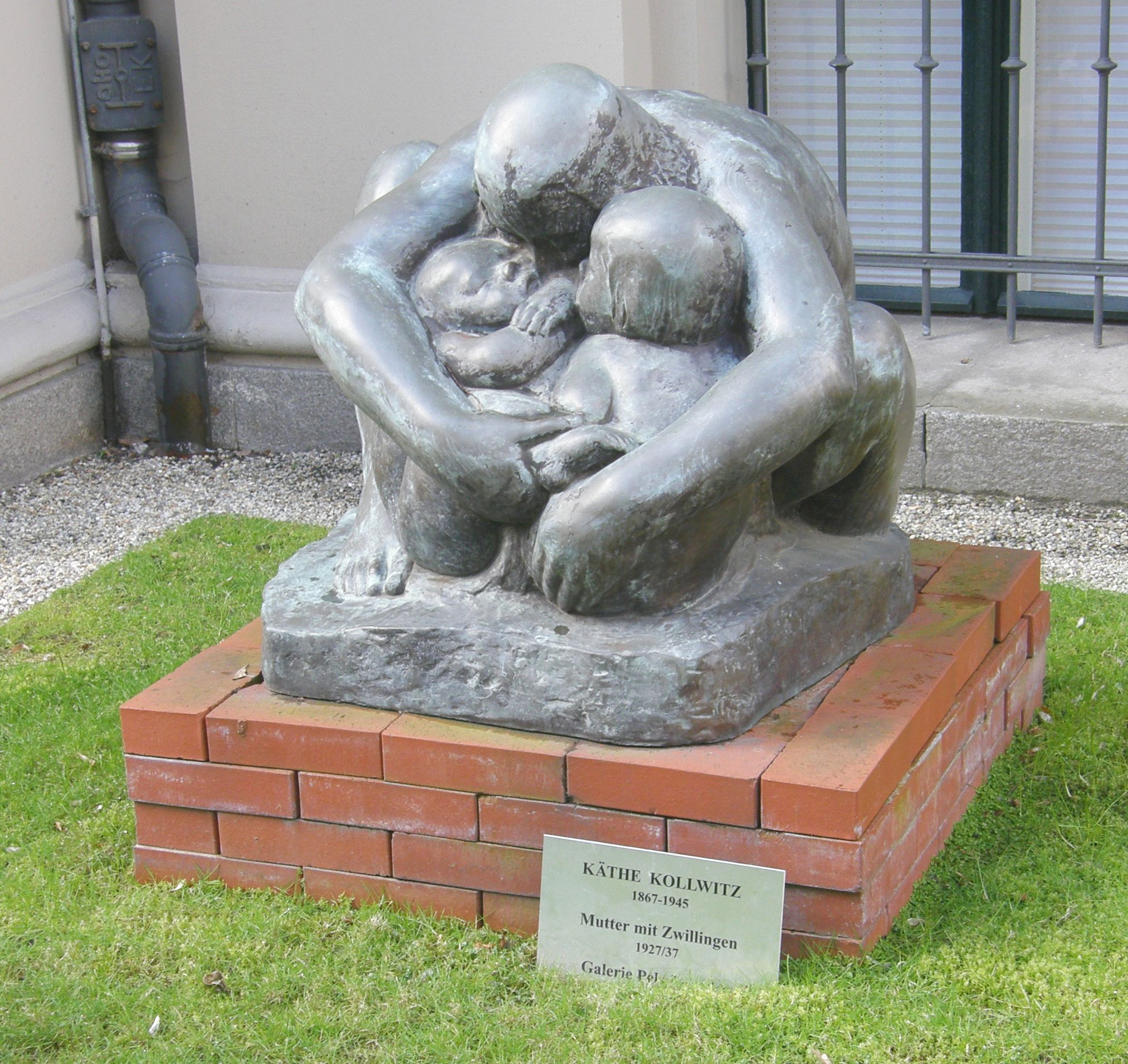
Mother and Twins (1927/37) by Expressionist sculptor Käthe Kollwitz

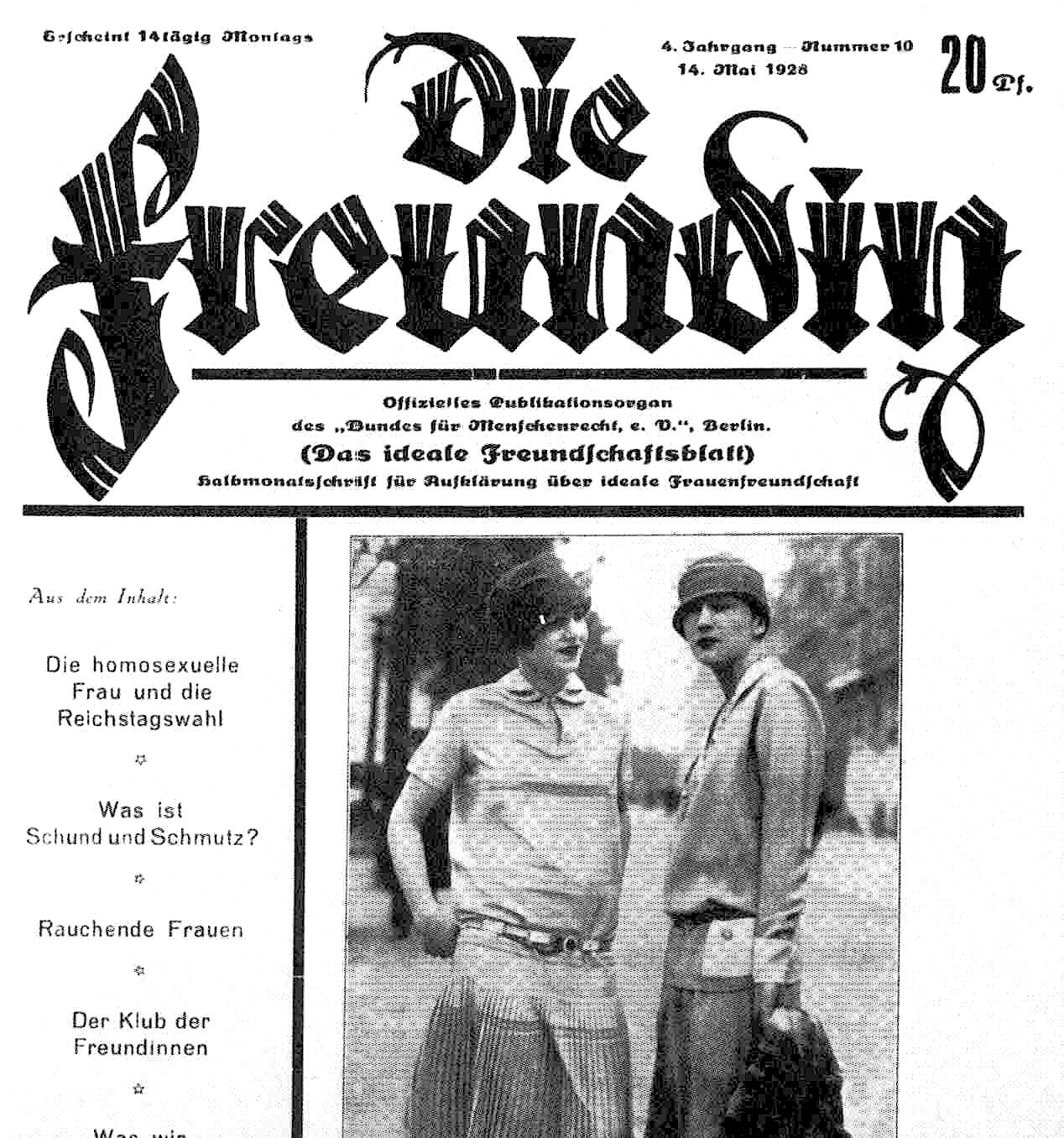
An issue of the lesbian periodical, Die Freundin, 1928

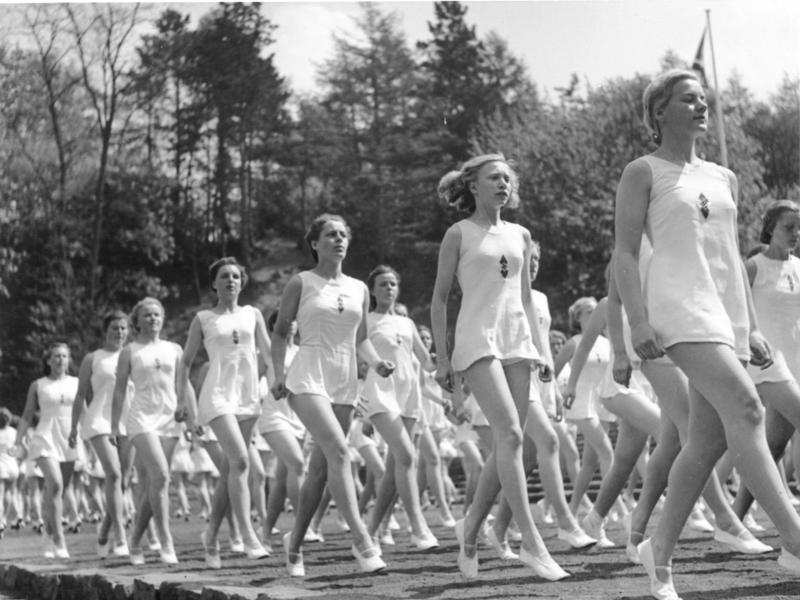
League of German Girls (Bund Deutscher Mädel or BDM) gymnastics performance, 1941

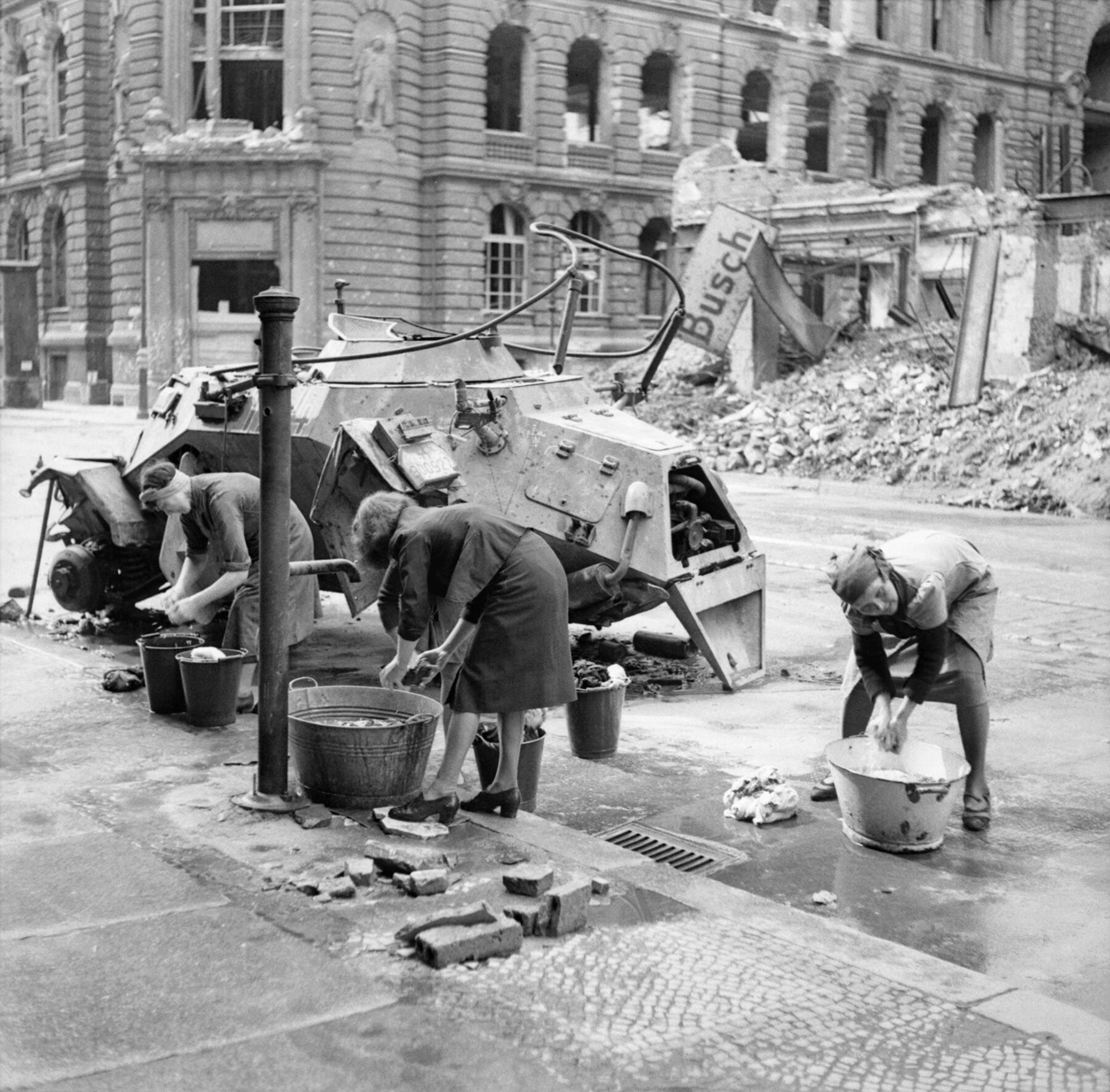
Women doing their wash at a cold water hydrant in a Berlin street, July 1945

The Weimar Republic was an era of political fragmentation in Germany. Along with the economic chaos of the inter-war years, Weimar culture in general had a degree of social chaos, which was experienced in the city of Berlin in particular. War widows and their children struggled to earn a living in a city where hunger, unemployment, and crime were rampant. At the same time, a liberation of social mores meant that women had a social freedom they had not experienced until then. Socialists and communists in particular became open in demanding free access to contraception and abortion, asserting, "Your body belongs to you".

=== Nazi era ===
Historians have paid special attention to Nazi Germany's efforts to reverse the gains that women made before 1933, especially during the liberal Weimar Republic. It appears the role of women in Nazi Germany changed according to circumstances. Theoretically, the Nazis believed that women must be subservient to men, avoid careers, devote themselves to childbearing and child-rearing, and be a helpmate of the traditional dominant father in the traditional family. However, before 1933, women played important roles in the Nazi organization and were allowed some autonomy to mobilize other women. After Adolf Hitler came to power in 1933, the activist women were replaced by bureaucratic women who emphasized feminine virtues, marriage, and childbirth. As Germany prepared for war, large numbers were incorporated into the public sector and with the need for full mobilization of factories by 1943, all women were required to register with the employment office. Women's wages remained unequal and women were denied positions of leadership or control.

In 1934, Hitler proclaimed, "[A woman's] world is her husband, her family, her children, her house." Women's highest calling was motherhood. Laws that had protected women's rights were repealed and new laws were introduced to restrict women to the home and in their roles as wives and mothers. Women were barred from government and university positions. Women's rights groups, such as the moderate BDF, were disbanded, and replaced with new social groups that would reinforce Nazi values, under the leadership of the Nazi Party and the head of women's affairs in Nazi Germany, Reichsfrauenführerin Gertrud Scholtz-Klink.

In 1944–45, more than 500,000 women volunteers were uniformed auxiliaries in the German armed forces (Wehrmacht). About the same number served in civil aerial defense, 400,000 volunteered as nurses, and many more replaced drafted men in the wartime economy. In the Luftwaffe, they served in combat roles helping to operate the anti—aircraft systems that shot down Allied bombers.

=== West Germany, East Germany ===
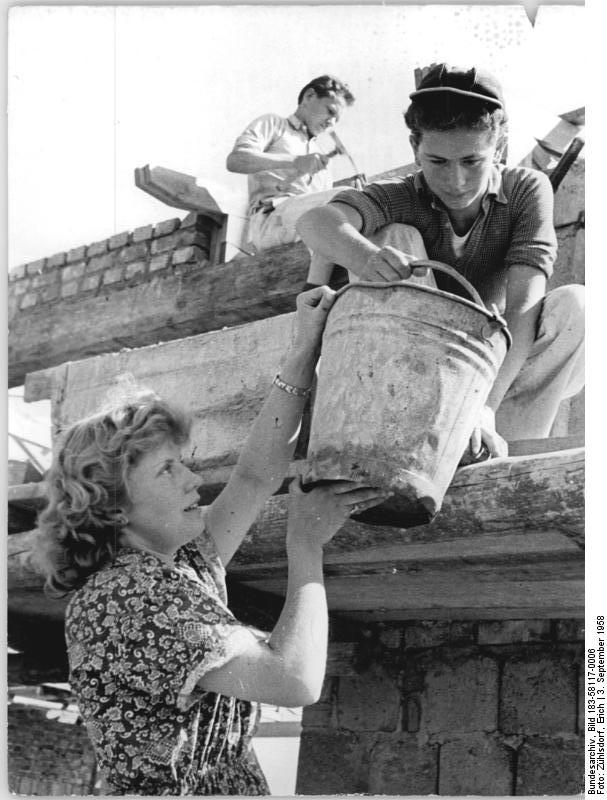
Women workers in the German Democratic Republic (East Germany), 1958

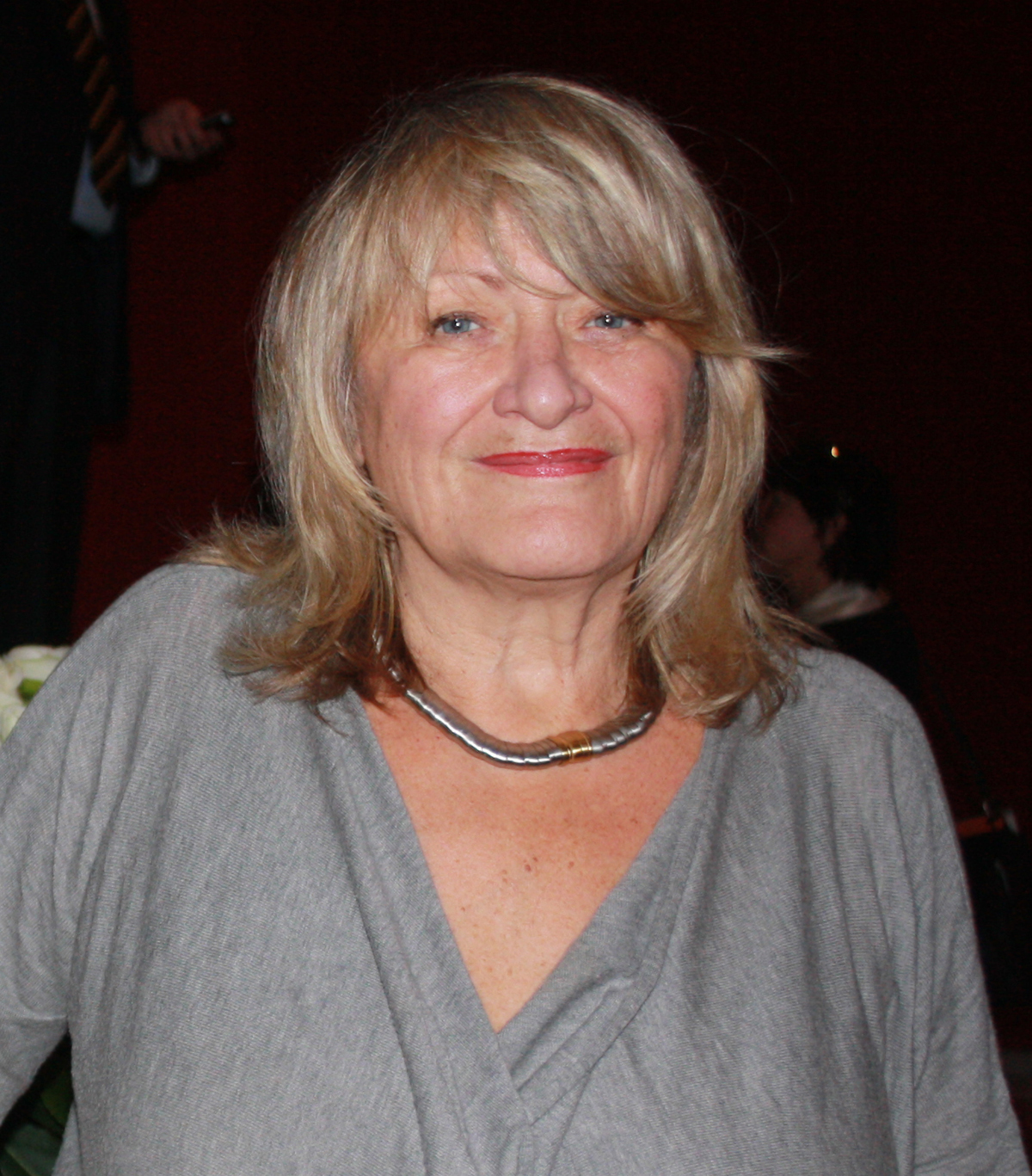
Alice Schwarzer, founder of EMMA and Germany's most prominent feminist, 2010

During the post-War period political life in the Federal Republic of Germany was conservative in character:

Political elites were dominated firstly by the CDU, a party focusing on economic growth and drawing on the support of established business interests and diverse local elites, and also latterly by the SDP with its traditional base in the male-dominated workers' organizations.

Demographic changes which resulted from World War II meant that women made up a larger proportion of the electorate for several decades, but this did not result in significant representation in government; by 1987, women still made up only 10% of the representatives in the Bundestag. Women had less education, and they were less likely to be employed, either in the professions, or the service industry.

Yet, after the Federal Republic of Germany began to make strides in its recovery from the aftermath of World War II, feminist issues began to rise to the surface of public consciousness. The works of feminist writers such as Betty Friedan were translated into German, and a new generation of German feminists began to agitate for social change. A disillusionment with conventional political parties, and even with standard Marxist activism, led to the growth of the radical left during the 1970s, including militant groups. Rote Zora was one anti-patriarchy terrorist group; while it carried out an estimated 45 bombings and arson attacks between 1974 and 1995, it accomplished little. The first established party in Germany to include equal rights for women in its program was the classic liberal FDP. A development in the Left that had a longer-lasting impact was the establishment of the Green Party in 1980. Feminists pushed the Green Party to include abortion reform as an "unqualified party commitment", and as more feminists became part of the Party leadership, women's rights were brought to prominence by the mid-1980s. West Germany's most well-known feminist, the "mediagenic" Alice Schwarzer, founded the popular feminist magazine EMMA in 1977, and remains its Editor-in-Chief.

State socialism in the German Democratic Republic (GDR) ostensibly meant equality between the sexes. Marxist writers such as Frederick Engels, August Bebel, and Clara Zetkin had written of the role of gender exploitation in capitalism. In the GDR, there was little public consciousness of conflict between the sexes, although women's rights were discussed by certain activist groups, drawing Stasi attention. The official GDR line during the 1960s and 1970s was that the Western feminist movement was "man-hating". Women in the GDR were reputed to have a more exhausting way of life than women in the FRG, for a number of reasons. In addition to a longer formal workweek for GDR workers, women performed three-quarters of the housework and childcare. Few people owned cars, and product shortages and long lines made errands such as grocery shopping more time-consuming. Although men were entitled to one year of parental leave following the birth of a child, they did not actually take it. By the 1970s, some GDR writers were observing that women's social roles were lagging their legal and economic status. Until 1977 married women in West Germany could not work without permission from their husbands. However, women began to receive extensions to paid maternity leave that were generous by Western standards.

== Feminism in Germany since unification ==
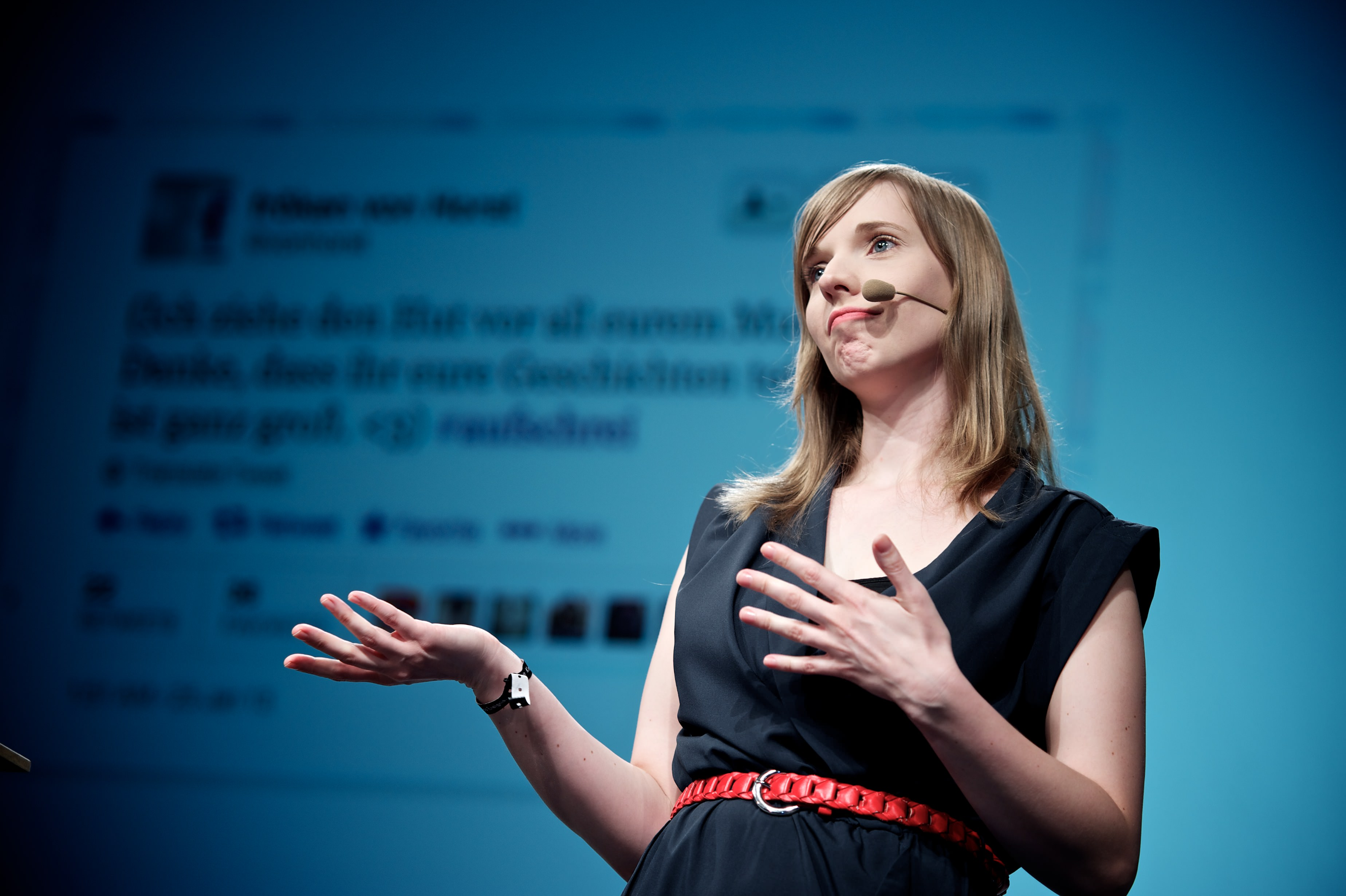
Anne Wizorek helped establish the hashtag #Aufschrei in 2013.

By the early 21st century, issues of intersectionality between diverse social groups gained the attention of a larger number of feminists and other social reformers in Germany and beyond. After decades of pushing for greater legal recognition as full citizens, Gastarbeiter (guest workers) and their children (often born and raised in Germany) won some reforms at the national level in the late 1990s. During this time, women's rights groups had not, in general, made the guest worker issue a feminist cause. There were sporadic instances of women's rights groups voicing support for women guest workers' right to vote, and to have other women's rights included in the government's 1998 draft law for guest workers.

Before 1997, the definition of rape in Germany was: "Whoever compels a woman to have extramarital intercourse with him, or with a third person, by force or the threat of present danger to life or limb, shall be punished by not less than two years’ imprisonment". In 1997 there were changes to the rape law, broadening the definition, making it gender-neutral, and removing the marital exemption. Before, marital rape could only be prosecuted as "Causing bodily harm" (Section 223 of the German Criminal Code), "Insult" (Section 185 of the German Criminal Code) and "Using threats or force to cause a person to do, suffer or omit an act" (Nötigung, Section 240 of the German Criminal Code) which carried lower sentences and were rarely prosecuted.

Feminist Anne Wizorek discussed the new feminism wave of her generation, stating:

A lot more feminists from my generation see intersectionality as a very important part of feminism. So the ways that we work together are more diverse, or at least we try to be as diverse as possible. So, when we talk about sexual violence, it’s not just sexual violence against white women, it’s also the violence that women with head scarfs, for example, experience on a daily basis, or trans women, or men too. So that’s a very important development that we see here.

Networked feminism, where women's rights activists communicate and organize using social media, is a growing trend among younger feminists in Germany. The Ukrainian feminist organization FEMEN, established in 2008, has spread to Germany as of 2013. Chapters have been founded in Berlin and Hamburg. In late 2012 and early 2013, Twitter became the medium of mass protests against common types of sexist harassment. Using a hashtag called #aufschrei (outcry), more than 100,000 tweets (messages) were sent to protest personal experiences of harassment, raising awareness of the issue and generating national and international press coverage.

Women's representation in government and the workforce has made progress in the early 21st century. The German Chancellor, Angela Merkel, has established her key role in European politics. Merkel's time in office has not been without controversy related to women's rights legislation; in 2013, she opposed an EU proposal to introduce 40-percent female quota on executive boards in all publicly listed companies with more than 250 employees by 2020, on the basis that this was a violation of member states' affairs. Germany's Labour Minister, Ursula von der Leyen, a supporter of the quota in Germany, received a written order from Merkel to "alter her ministry's lack of an objection to the EU directive, so that the cabinet could present a unified face to Germany's EU officials". However, in March 2015 the SPD party won the battle on female quota. A new law requires about 100 companies to appoint women on 30 percent of their supervisory board seats, beginning in 2016. In addition, 3,500 companies are required to submit plans to increase the female share in top positions.

== See also ==
- Second-wave feminism in Germany
- Binnen-I – an orthographic convention for equality in written German
- Bonn Women's Museum
- EMMA (magazine)
- Feminale
- History of German women
- Liberal Women
- Weimar culture
- Women in Germany
- Women in Nazi Germany
