= Second-wave feminism in Germany =

The emergence of second-wave feminism was a key component of feminism in Germany. The second wave (emerging during the first half of the 20th century) was heavily influenced by the policies of the Third Reich and its attitudes towards gender roles, and those of the postwar era.

== First wave ==
Historically, social systems throughout the world were organized paternally. Patriarchal structures can be found in all areas of society: in governmental power structures, in the economies of developing countries, in the sciences and in medicine. The first changes to this system appeared as a self-conscious, feminist movement.

The emergence of women's movements and the discussion of women's rights was contingent on the French Revolution's goals to achieve universal equality. On 14 September 1791, French feminist Olympe de Gouges demanded equal rights for men and women. During this period, the women's movement was influenced predominantly by class issues. Louise Otto-Peters is believed to be the founder of the first middle-class women's movement which pursued the participation of women in education and politics. According to Otto-Peters, female participation in politics was a duty rather than a right.

During the mid-19th century, women's movements formed in France, England, the United States, and Australia. Hubertine Auclert, editor of the newspaper La Citoyenne (Female Citizen) coined the term "féminisme" in 1882 as a political principle. Auclert had protested the French government's decision to deny women the right to vote, stood as an illegal candidate for the French government and refused to pay taxes: "I have no rights, therefore, I have no taxes; I do not vote, I do not pay." Auclert's term was introduced in 1896 at an international women's convention in Berlin (the Internationaler Kongress für Frauenwerke und Frauenbestrebungen) as a synonym for Frauenbewegung ("women's movement").

== The Third Reich and women ==
Nazism made drastic changes to German society, restructuring it around Nazi values. In 1933, Baldur von Schirach was appointed Reichsjugendführer (Reich youth leader) by Adolf Hitler. Before 1933, youth organizations such as the Boy Scouts existed as part of German Christian or political associations. Von Schirach formed a uniformed youth movement out of those groups, the Hitler Youth, with membership becoming mandatory in 1936.

The Hitler Youth was structured by gender. It had two groups: the militaristic Hitler Jugend and Deutsches Jungvolk for boys, and the Bund Deutscher Mädchen to train girls to be "obedient housewi[ves] and mother[s]".

In 1933, the Nazis banned female professors from teaching at universities. National Socialist legislation from 1933 to 1945 restricted women's right to attend university, leading to a rupture in academic employment and career development for women. Discriminatory Nazi legislature was also evident in the Judiciary Training Regulations of 22 July 1934, according to which female lawyers were "einen Einbruch in den altgeheiligten Grundsatz der Männlichkeit des Staates" ("an invasion of the holy and established principles of the nation's manliness"). The Nazis destroyed women's organizations, exiling Anita Augspurg and Lida Gustava Heymann (pioneers of the first women's movement and opponents of the Nazi regime) to Switzerland in 1933.

Near the end of World War II, women were required to work in factories to compensate for the lack of male labor. Although their economic value changed, their social status did not. Barbara Brennan described how they were perceived: "The German women who survived the Second World War are often characterized by the familiar images of long lines of women digging the country out from underneath the rubble."

== After World War II ==
After the collapse of the Third Reich, women were gradually relieved of their new duties by returning prisoners of war. Women who served the country during the war as volunteers or conscripts had to face the repercussions of their actions, which affected their careers and personal lives.

Feminism was virtually non-existent from 1945 to 1966. An important exception is a phrase in the human-rights section of the new German constitution, which states: "Men and women have equal rights". This is similar to the Weimarer Reichsverfassung, the Weimar Republic constitution, whose Article 109 read: "Alle Deutschen sind vor dem Gesetze gleich" ("All Germans are equal under the law") and "Männer und Frauen haben grundsätzlich dieselben staatsbürgerlichen Rechte und Pflichten" ("Men and women have strictly the same rights and obligations.")

=== 1949 German constitution ===
The 1949 German constitution was developed and written by a group of 65 politicians. Of the 65, only four were women: Frieda Nadig, Elisabeth Selbert, Helene Weber and Helene Wessel. All four were pioneers of the postwar German women's movement.

==== Elisabeth Selbert ====
Selbert was a lawyer who had a limited primary and secondary education due to poverty. After finding a job in a telegraph office, Selbert graduated from college and attended law school in Göttingen and Marburg. One of five female law students among the 300 men, she passed her exams with honours just before the laws barring women from universities took effect in December 1934. Selbert became a leading advocate of sexual equality.

==== Frieda Nadig ====
Nadig was born in Herford on 11 December 1897. Like her father, who was a German politician for the Sozialdemokratische Partei Deutschlands (SPD) until 1931, she began her political career in 1916 and was elected as a representative of the provincial council in Westfalen. In 1933 the Provincial Diet was abolished by the Third Reich, and Nadig was no longer a representative. She refused to commit herself politically until 1947, when she became an elected SPD member of the new German state parliament of Nordrhein-Westfalen. In addition to her position as state representative, she was chosen as a member of the parliamentary council (Parlamentarischer Rat). Although Selbert and the SPD implemented gender equality in the German constitution, her demands for wage equality and equal treatment for children born to married and unmarried parents were unsuccessful.

==== Helene Weber ====
Unencumbered by Nazi Party membership and providing expertise as a former member of the national council, Helene Weber became part of the parliament council at the behest of Konrad Adenauer (the Federal Republic of Germany's first chancellor). While creating the German constitution, the CDU (Christian Democratic Union of Germany) politician addressed its meaning and phrased it to emphasise the importance of human life and dignity. After hesitating about women's rights, she proposed "Männer und Frauen stehen bei Wahl und Ausübung des Berufes gleich, verrichten sie gleiche Arbeit, so haben sie Anspruch auf gleiche Entlohnung" ("Men and Women are equal in their choice and execution of work. If they accomplish the same, they have the right to equal wages.")

=== Equal Rights Law ===
In 1957, the Equal Rights Law (Gleichberechtigungsgesetz) became effective. German legislation differs from the British and American legal systems, which are based on case law. In Germany, a 2,385-paragraph Bürgerliches Gesetzbuch (BGB, civil code) and a 358-paragraph Strafgesetzbuch (criminal code) resolve legal questions.

The BGB (influenced by the Napoleonic Code) was enacted on 1 January 1900, and many changes were needed to reconcile it with contemporary values. In 1949 (when the German constitution was enacted) equal rights were missing from the civil and criminal code, and the Equal Rights Law was intended to correct the omission. The final changes concerning gender inequality were made on 25 April 2006.

=== Existing problems ===
From 1949 to 1965 Germany had a conservative government and Konrad Adenauer, its Roman Catholic chancellor, was regarded as resistant to change. Marriage and the family were protected by traditional role models, and a married woman's legal standing did not correspond with that of a married man. The husband's role as master of the house (Haushaltsvorstand), was legally defined. He made important decisions, and his consent was required for his wife to open a bank account. Until 1977 a married woman needed her husband's consent to obtain an employment contract, and he decided the use of his wife's earnings. Abuse (including rape) in a marriage was not punishable, unlike abortion.

Girls from rural or working-class backgrounds were heavily underrepresented in secondary and tertiary schools. War veterans were given preference at the few remaining universities in postwar Germany, and had taken most of the educational slots. Over 50 percent of women graduating from gymnasiums (Germany's academic secondary schools) were forced to abandon further academic education. Universities had very few female professors, and only one-third of all women were employed. Gender-specific, stereotypically-female jobs (known as low-wage or mini-jobs) were created to encourage women to remain housewives.

== Second-wave feminism ==
During the 1960s several feminist groups were founded, which were characterized as the second wave. University students began questioning their educators, many of whom were considered former Nazi collaborators:

After the bitter experience of the Nazi regime and Second World War, Germans, both in East and West turned away from militarism. Although West Germany decided in the early 1950s – despite strong protests in Parliament and among the public – to follow East Germany in rebuilding an army and (unlike East Germany) join NATO, West German soldiers took no part in international combat missions until German reunification in 1990.

— Mark Davis

This political environment enabled the formation of a new women's movement: second-wave feminism. At a 13 September 1968 conference of the Socialist German Student Association (Sozialistischer Deutscher Studentenbund, or SDS), Helke Sander, a female SDS activist of the SDS, blamed her male colleagues for not pushing social criticism far enough and ignoring discrimination against women. The SDS was the mirror image of a masculine society. When the association did not discuss the issue and returned to the initial agenda, Sigrid Rüger (a member of the West Berlin SDS and Aktionsrat zur Befreiung der Frauen, the Mission for the Liberation of Women) hit an SDS board member with a tomato. That day, female members of the SDS regional councils founded Weiberräte ("hag-councils") and formed women's centres. The centres encouraged women to protest against "division of labour, birth control, laws, sexuality in politics and abortion".

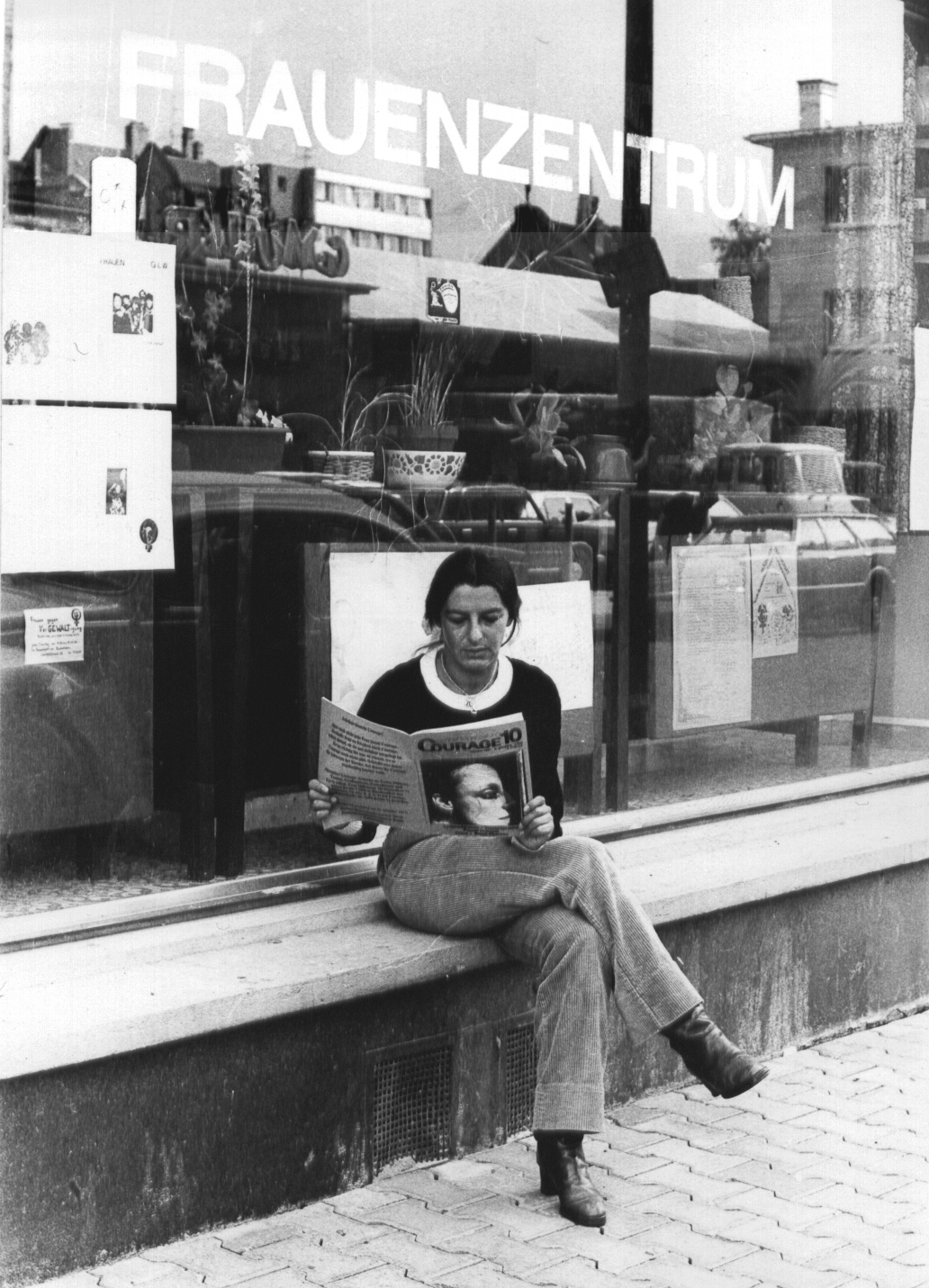
Frauenzentrum Westberlin pictured in Frankfurt 1973

Cristina Perincioli states that it was the women of the Undogmatische Linke, "the Sponti [from spontaneous] women who (re-)founded the feminist movement. For that reason it is worth taking a closer look at anarchist theory and tradition", further explaining:

In the 1970s, the '68er movement split into many factions of a Leninist, revisionist or Maoist bent, each following their various dogmas. The membership numbers of the non-dogmatic left, in contrast, remained tiny, less than 1 percent of the overall Left. We had no dogmas, no pioneering thinkers and no leaders. How were we supposed to find out what would make political sense now? Which objectives were worth pursuing? How should we proceed? Among the dogmatists, all these questions were handled by a small leadership circle or even dictated by the GDR (German Democratic Republic) or China. We non-dogmatics sought inspiration elsewhere. For instance, we read the works of Frantz Fanon, the publications of the Black Panther Party for Self-Defense the memoirs of the Russian-American anarchist Emma Goldman, and maintained contacts with French and Italian autonomous groups.

In the 1970s, the West German women's centers, cradle of all those feminist projects, were so inventive and productive because "[e]very group at the Berlin women's center was autonomous and could choose whatever field they wished to work in. The plenary never tried to regiment the groups. Any group or individual could propose actions or new groups, and they were welcome to realize their ideas as long as they could find enough people to help them. There was thus no thematic let alone political "line" that determined whether an enterprise was right and permissible. Not having to follow a line also had the advantage of flexibility". The Berlin women's center's info of 1973 stated: "We constantly and collectively developed the women's center's self-understanding. We therefore do not have a self-understanding on paper, but are learning together."

A prominent example for this gives the founding of the Frauenzentrum Westberlin in 1973: "We simply skipped the step of a theoretical platform, which was a must in other groups. Even before this meeting there was a consensus, so that we didn't need a lot of discussion, because all of us had the same experience with left-wing groups behind us."

Autonomous feminists of the women's centers viewed the West German state with deep distrust. To apply for state funds was unthinkable (apart for a women's shelter). In the 1970s the search for terrorists would affect any young person active in whatever groups. Over years women's centers were searched by Police as well as cars and homes of many feminists. The West Berlin women's center went on a week-long hunger strike in 1973 in support of the women strike in prison and rallied repeatedly at the women's jail in Lehrter Straße. From this jail, Inge Viett escaped in 1973 and 1976.

In the West Berlin anarchist newspaper Agit 883, a Women's Liberation Front proclaimed in 1969 combatively that "it will raise silently out of the darkness, strike and disappear again and criticized the women who "brag about jumping onto a party express without realizing that the old jalopy has to be electrified first before it can drive. They've chosen security over the struggle".

Many women joined the Red Army Faction and the anarchist militant 2 June Movement. Neither of these terrorist groups showed feminist concerns. The women's group Rote Zora (split from the Revolutionäre Zellen) legitimized militance with feminist theory in the 1980s and attacked bioengineering facilities. Some women disillusioned with the racism of Rote Zora but agreeing with its main points moved on to the anti-racist fantifa movement derivative of antifa.

== See also ==
- Feminism in Germany
