= Nacktfussball =

Germon erotic football competition

Nacktfussball (German for "naked football") is a semi-serious erotic association football competition for women held in Berlin, Germany since June 2013.

Nacktfussball consists of matches between two teams of four women each. Players start out in normal football outfits, but every time a goal is scored, the opposing team has to remove a piece of clothing. Once both teams are fully naked, the match continues for seven minutes and then ends.

The first Nacktfussball event was held in Berlin on 7 to 9 June 2013. It will since continue a couple of times per year.

The event attracted the attention and provoked protests of the German feminist movement.
