= EFID =

EFID may refer to:

- Protestant Women in Germany or Evangelische Frauen in Deutschland, German Christian group
- Epilepsy-intellectual disability in females or Epilepsy limited to females with intellectual disability
