= Fantifa =

Feminist anti-fascist movements

One variant of fantifa symbol, displaying an anarcha-feminist purple flag symbolic of the female gender instead of the traditional socialist red flag of Antifaschistische Aktion.

Fantifa (sometimes rendered as f_antifa or f*antifa; a contraction of German Feministische Antifa, lit. feminist anti-fascism, or Frauen Antifa, lit. women's anti-fascism) is an umbrella term for anti-fascism movements centering on women as a branch of the feminist movement. The term mostly refers to a formal movement of feminist anti-fascist groups that emerged from German-speaking countries in 1985 but also encompasses historical German groups such as the 1925 Rote Frauen und Mädelbund (the women and girls' branch of the Roter Frontkämpferbund) and broader European groups such as the 1930s Spanish anarcha-feminist group Mujeres Libres, the 1934 French women's branch of the World Committee Against War and Fascism, and the 1942 Yugoslavian partisan group Women's Antifascist Front of Yugoslavia. The main fantifa movement holds an anarcho-communist philosophy and is specifically an anti-fascist variant of anarcha-feminism, as is sometimes represented in the use of a purple and black flag with a symbol derivative of that of the men's antifa group Antifaschistische Aktion.

== History ==
=== 1980s and 1990s ===
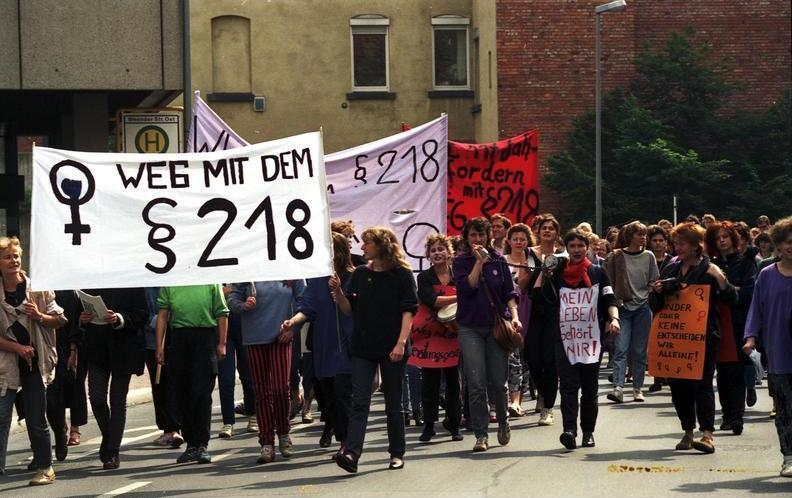
West German feminists protesting restrictions on abortion in 1988.

Fantifa has its roots in the West German antifa movement and in anti-fascist sentiments of German second-wave feminist groups such as Rote Zora, which emphasized anarchist defiance through terrorist action. In 1980, Rote Zora issued a statement urging feminists to take action against every form of oppression, including that imposed by the state. Concerns of theirs included genetic engineering as a form of eugenics and § 218 of the German Penal Law limiting abortion. 1980s Black and Jewish feminist criticism of Rote Zora in displaying aspects of white feminism coincided with women's resentment toward machismo in the antifa movement and led to the creation of fantifa, beginning with a Northern Germany women's antifa meeting in 1985. As it came as a response to restrictive second-wave feminist politics and extended into the 1990s, this era of fantifa can be classified as third-wave feminism.

The term "fantifa" was coined in 1988, with small meetings of no more than fifteen people occurring in 1989, which covered topics including violence against women. Following the fall of the Berlin Wall, the first nationwide German fantifa meeting was held on the weekend of January 20-21, 1990, covering the topics of lesbophobia, eugenics, anti-abortion movements, and § 218. It was the first antifa meeting to feature daycare, to allow women with children to participate. By the end of the 1990s, there were twenty-five fantifa groups.

Fantifa initially met with conflict from antifa men who viewed women's rights groups as fascist, perceiving feminism's antagonism toward patriarchy as misandry equivalent to antisemitic hatred. Further confusion was caused by the historical example of fascist woman Sophie Rogge-Börner writing to Adolf Hitler in 1933 to preach for uplifting women who wished to take on more traditionally masculine gender roles within the Nazi movement, but she distanced herself from feminism and fantifa activists did not consider her one either, merely a fascist seeking an androgyny within patriarchy. In the mid-1990s, a Hamburg men's antifa group accepted fantifa and promoted feminist talking points within the context of antifa academic discourse, as did a 1998 Berlin leftist newspaper. However, very few men showed up in solidarity at 1990s fantifa protests.

Internal discord over how to handle the intersection of racism and sexism and if fantifa's primary focus should be lesbian rights threatened to fracture the movement early on but antisemitic violence in 1992 brought the movement together with a common enemy: neo-Nazism, manifesting in groups like the Free German Workers' Party. Like in the main German antifa movement, neo-Nazi antisemitic violence throughout the 1990s emboldened fantifa in response. 1990s fantifa feminist activism included anti-pornography efforts, distributing flyers to advocate for closing down sex shops and encouraging men not to view pornography, as well as protesting anti-abortion movements, supporting the anti-nuclear movement, and demonstrating on International Women's Day.

Another nationwide Germany fantifa meeting was held in Berlin in 1999, but the movement lost momentum after that. In 2000, a fantifa member accused an antifa man of raping her in 1998. The resulting fallout caused a divide in men's antifa groups, either choosing to embrace feminism as a worthy cause or deny it as relevant to anti-fascism. Fantifa dwindled after that for a variety of reasons; however, it saw a resurgence in the 2010s.

=== 21st century ===
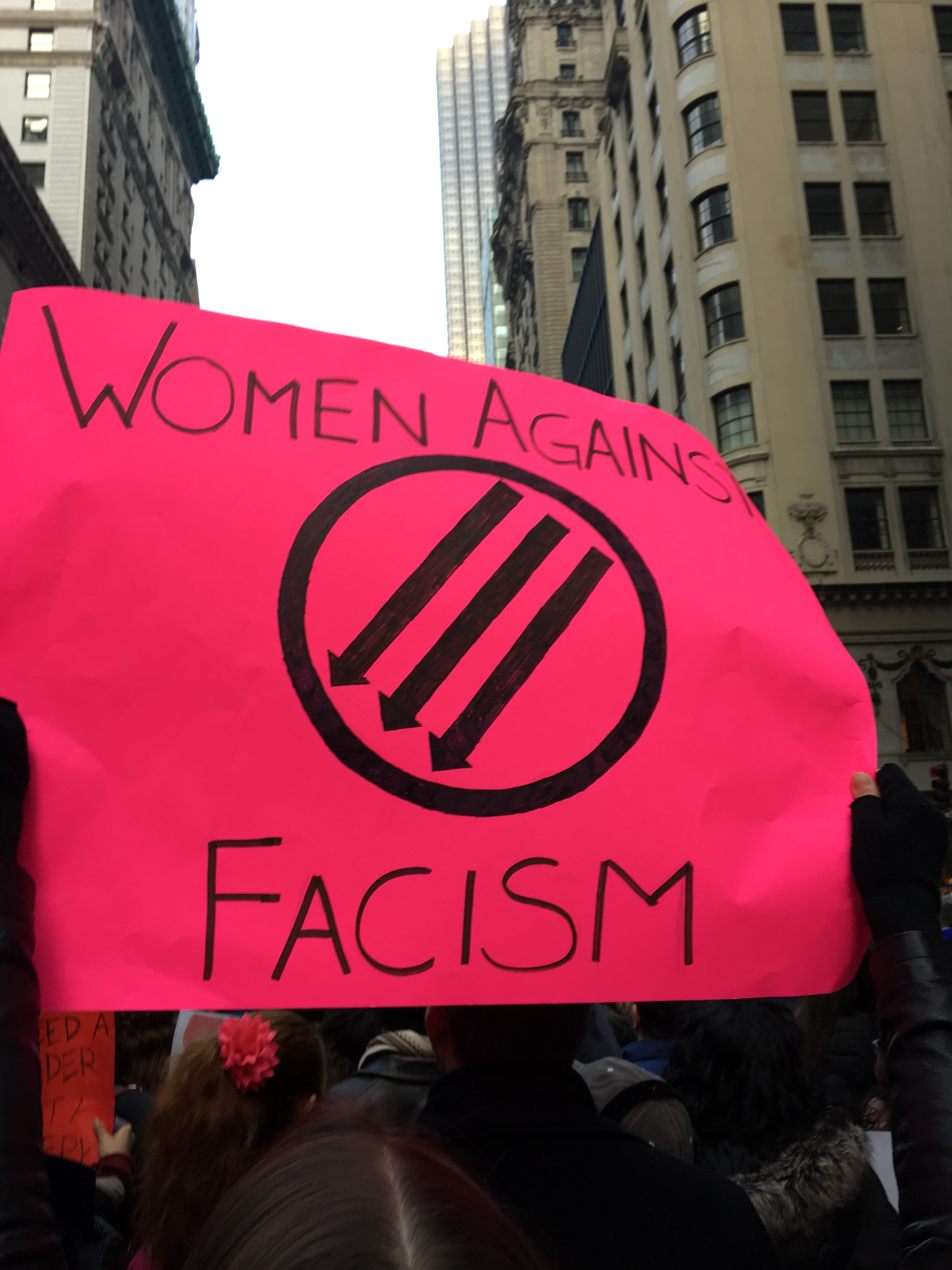
A "women against fascism" sign with the Three Arrows symbol at the 2017 Women's March in New York City

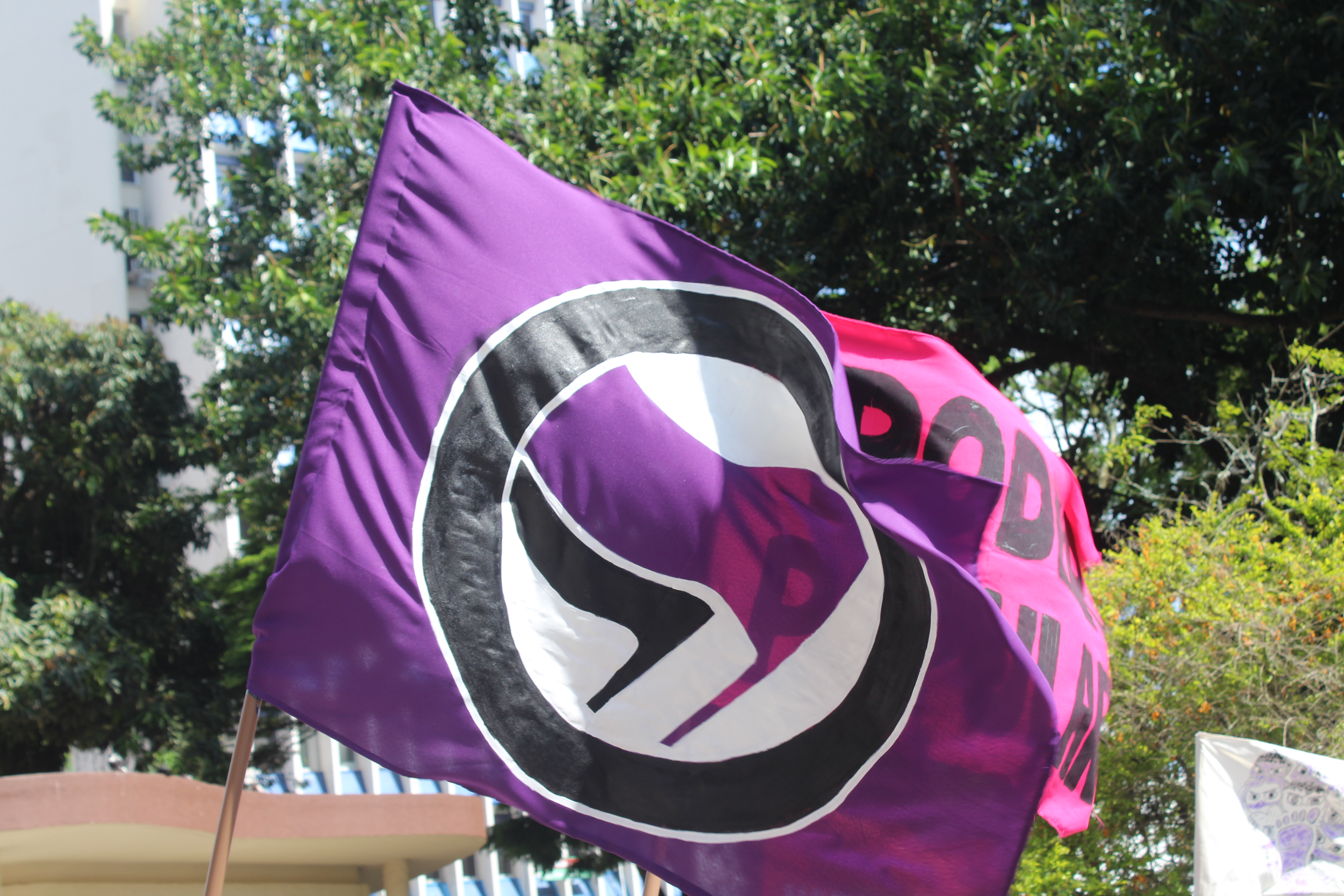
A fantifa flag is flown at a 2018 protest in the Ele Não movement in Brazil.

The general German antifa movement fractured in 2001, splintering off into competing anti-nationalist groups. Following the September 11 attacks, far-left movements increasingly turned their aggression toward other leftist movements instead of viewing the threat of neo-Nazism as important enough to actively target. Antifa groups lost their perceived relevancy, and fantifa likewise diminished into obscurity.

Simultaneously, the fantifa of the 1990s could not continue in its same form very far into the 2000s due to the changing nature of feminism. The influence of Judith Butler disrupted the radical feminist politics of German feminism. When fantifa was revived, feminism was transitioning from its third wave to its fourth and fantifa incorporated queer feminist ideology as part of this shift.

In 2016, fantifa participated in a Goethe University Frankfurt student effort to aggregate reports of abuse committed by pickup artists. By 2017, fantifa was celebrated among common German feminist protest chants with the English/German chant, "High kick, low kick, Fantifa; Feminismus schalala!" ("feminism sha la la"). After the 2018 Brazilian election of Jair Bolsonaro, the fantifa flag was flown as part of the Ele Não movement. In 2020, fantifa activists performed various destructive but nonviolent acts of vandalism such as throwing a stink bomb into a neo-Nazi tattoo parlor.

As the German far-right saw increased popularity with the founding of Alternative for Germany, there was a corresponding increase in anti-feminist sentiment. Fantifa became more relevant, encouraging fantifa protest activity in response to high-profile homophobic and transphobic violence that feminists associate with misogyny.

== Theory and ideology ==
=== Treatment of fascism ===
Fantifa addresses fascism in its aspect as an antifeminist movement. Fascism is analyzed as a phenomenon encompassing male and female gender roles and fantifa theory discusses the roles of fascist women (as well as gender relations in the anti-fascist movement). Though some feminists are so biased by antagonism to men that they may characterize fascism as equivalent to the way all men are perceived to demonstrate domineering and aggressive traits, fantifa theorists believe the only effective way to address fascism as an antifeminist movement requires a complete dissolution of gendered conflict and oppose this perspective. Fantifa rejects the view that women are too peaceful by nature to take part in aggressive movements, both antifa itself and fascism, and it pushes for a more inclusive understanding of both to recognize the role of women within them.

A 1989 fantifa brochure describes fascism as an institution based on patriarchal aggression. It suggests that fascism could not exist without society already embracing patriarchy and encourages antifa members to embrace the feminist movement to target a root cause of fascism. Members of Bonn-based fantifa group Fantifa Bonn identified anti-abortion activist Dr. Ferdinand Oeter as a former Nazi seemingly attempting to bolster the reproduction of white German citizens as an exercise in eugenics and to seed the culture with values that would support a return to fascism, having previously made a 1937 statement indicating the importance of keeping women in traditional gender roles as mothers and homemakers to rescue a perceived dying essential whiteness and bolster cultural Nazism. Oeter was a member of the Deutsche Liga für das Kind (German League for Children), an antifeminist group part of a movement fighting for a state subsidy for women to become stay-at-home mothers. The campaign was explicitly derived from Nazi policies, brought into the modern day by former Nazi eugenicist Friedrich Burgdörfer, and Oeter contributed the narrative that West Germany taking this route would lead to economic growth. This effort escaped notice of men's antifa movements as what they would consider an issue of concern before fantifa called attention to it. Another aspect of antifascist action central to the lives of women that fantifa engages in is the identification of fascist women to expose them to the judgment of the public.

=== Relation to other ideologies ===
Though rooted in radical feminist theory, fantifa's focus on the opposition of fascism generally keeps it from embracing conservative variants of feminism. Particularly, the persecution of homosexuals in Nazi Germany and neo-Nazi targeting of transgender and intersex people influences fantifa to reject gender-critical feminism. An early focus of fantifa was the movement for lesbian rights, calling attention to Nazi persecution of lesbians as relevant to antifa, and it maintains a strong element of LGBT advocacy. Fantifa members may specifically use the acronym FLTI (Frauen, meaning Women; Lesbians, Transgender people, and Intersex people) as a single group they seek to uplift. Fantifa embraces intersectional feminism and opposes forms of feminism that reproduce oppression against marginalized groups.

The fantifa movement has internal tensions. Early fantifa was marked by strains of lesbian separatism critical of involvement with men's antifa groups but this eventually gave way to cooperation between genders, if not always allowing cisgender men into individual fantifa groups. As is shared by the greater antifa movement in Germany, there is controversy over handling of the Israeli–Palestinian conflict, with some fantifa groups such as the Antifaschistischer Frauenblock Leipzig viewing support of Israel as anti-fascist while others view Israel as a fascist state whose opposition is a part of the anti-fascist cause. Though the vast majority of fantifa members are white able-bodied cis women of middle-class academic backgrounds, they try to encourage diversity in their movement.

=== Relation to men's antifa groups ===
Fantifa brings a critical look at gender relations within antifa movements. Though antifa men may intellectually oppose sexism, they may also display unconscious sexist behavior. Women can often feel marginalized and not taken seriously in male-centric antifa groups and seek relief in women's groups. Women may also be unable to receive proper education on antifa culture and practices that antifa men learn as youths in antifa groups for young people and are not forthright with knowledge themselves. Another focus of fantifa's criticism is how male antifa can harbor sexual predators as an aspect of rape culture, as was shown in a 2000 rape scandal.

A provocative early 1990s demonstration asserted that antifa men who refuse to be critical of patriarchy actually support fascism by implicitly embracing male dominance and antifa women would be unable to trust them. One meaningful change fantifa brought to antifa was pushing for the widespread availability of daycare at antifa meetings, without which women with children were often unable to participate.

In contrast to men's antifa movements favoring violent direct action techniques of punching neo-Nazis in direct confrontations, fantifa activists often believe this is contemptible toxic masculinity, inefficient for fixing the larger societal problem of Nazism as a phenomenon, and should not be undertaken in cases where violence can be avoided. To prepare for cases where violence is unavoidable, fantifa promotes women learning self-defense skills such as Wen-Do but emphasizes not delivering the first blow. Activists trained in Wen-Do or similar martial arts provide a line of defense to protect untrained demonstrators from neo-Nazi aggression and take part in urban patrols to protect women on the streets who may otherwise suffer sexual assault or other violence at the hands of men. Fantifa is critical of antifa men employing first strike violence on neo-Nazi women, often viewing it as a form of violence against women when not undertaken solely as self-defense. However, fantifa will engage in property destruction under the perception that it does not count as violent action if no one is harmed.

== See also ==
- Antifa (Germany)
- Feminism in Germany
- Take Back the Night
