= Juliane Leopold =

German journalist (born 1983)

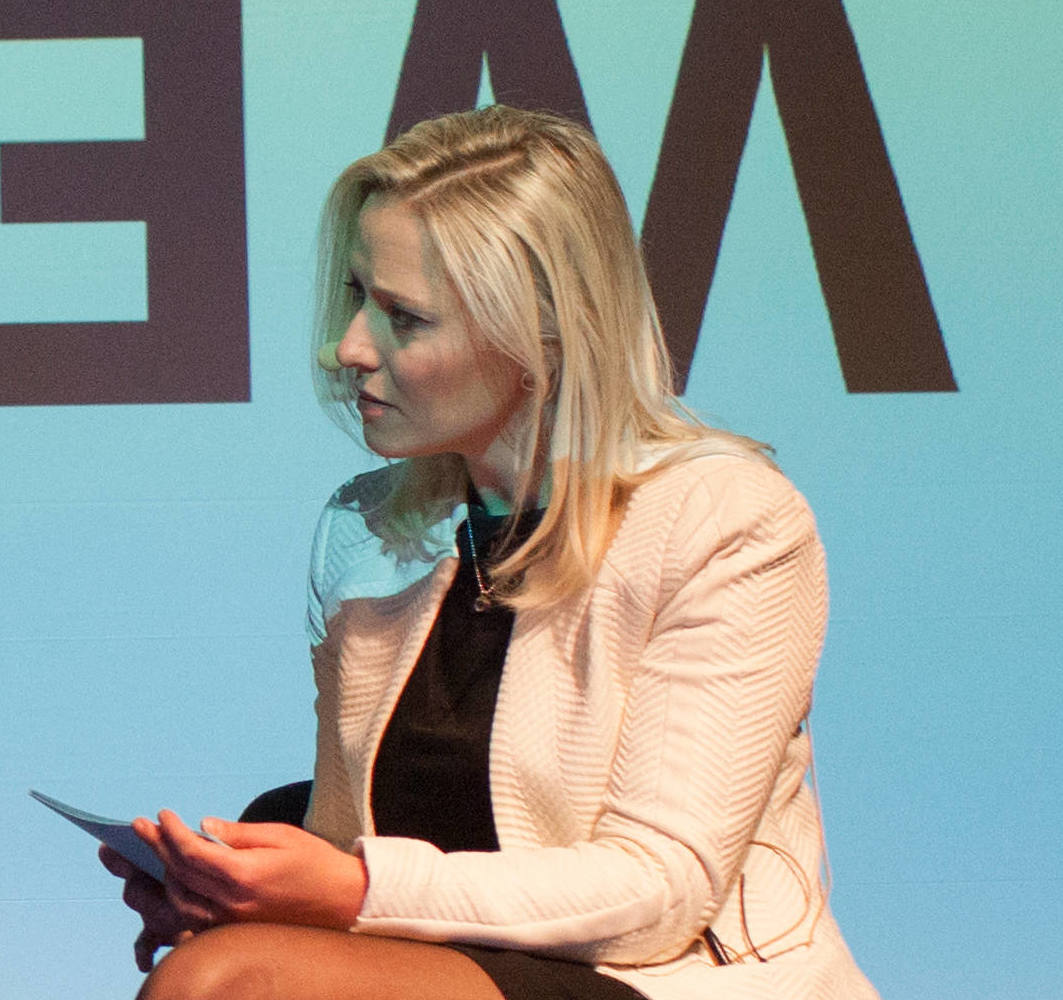
- Leopold, 2016
- Born: 1983 (age 42–43); Halle (Saale), East Germany
- Occupation: Journalist
- Website: www.julianeleopold.de

Juliane Leopold (born 1983) is a German journalist.

== Life ==
From January 2013 to December 2018 she was editor-in-chief of the feminist blog Kleinerdrei with Anne Wizorek. From October 2014 to January 2016 she was editor-in-chief of the German edition of BuzzFeed. She came runner up in the newcomer category of Medium Magazine's Journalists of the Year 2014. She worked as a consultant for tagesschau.de. from June 2016 to July 2018 before taking over as editor-in-chief. Since October 2019, she has been the digital editor-in-chief of ARD-aktuell.
