= Anne Wizorek =

German journalist (born 1981)

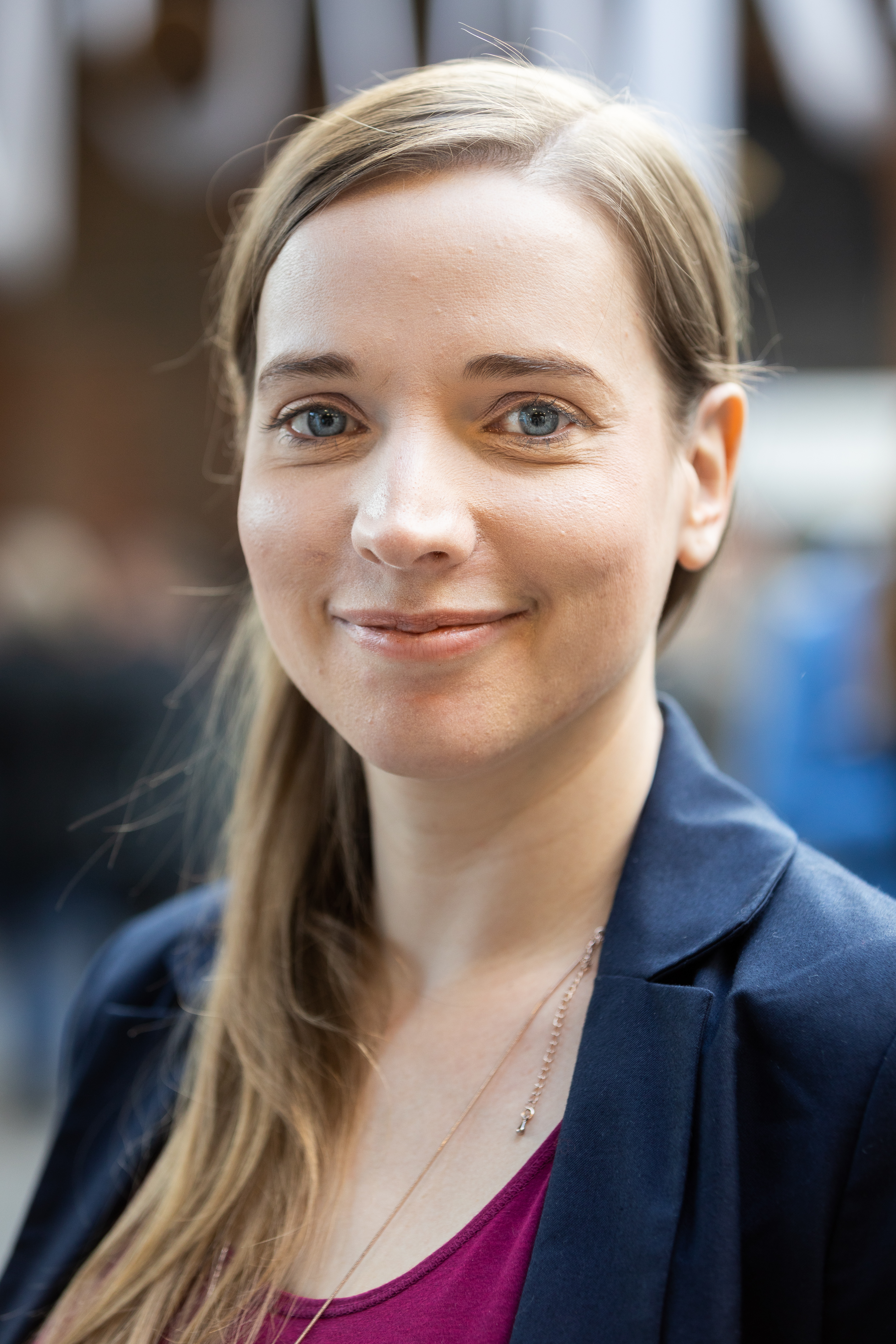
- Wizorek in 2019
- Born: May 5, 1981 (age 45); Rüdersdorf, East Germany
- Occupation: Journalist
- Website: www.annewizorek.de

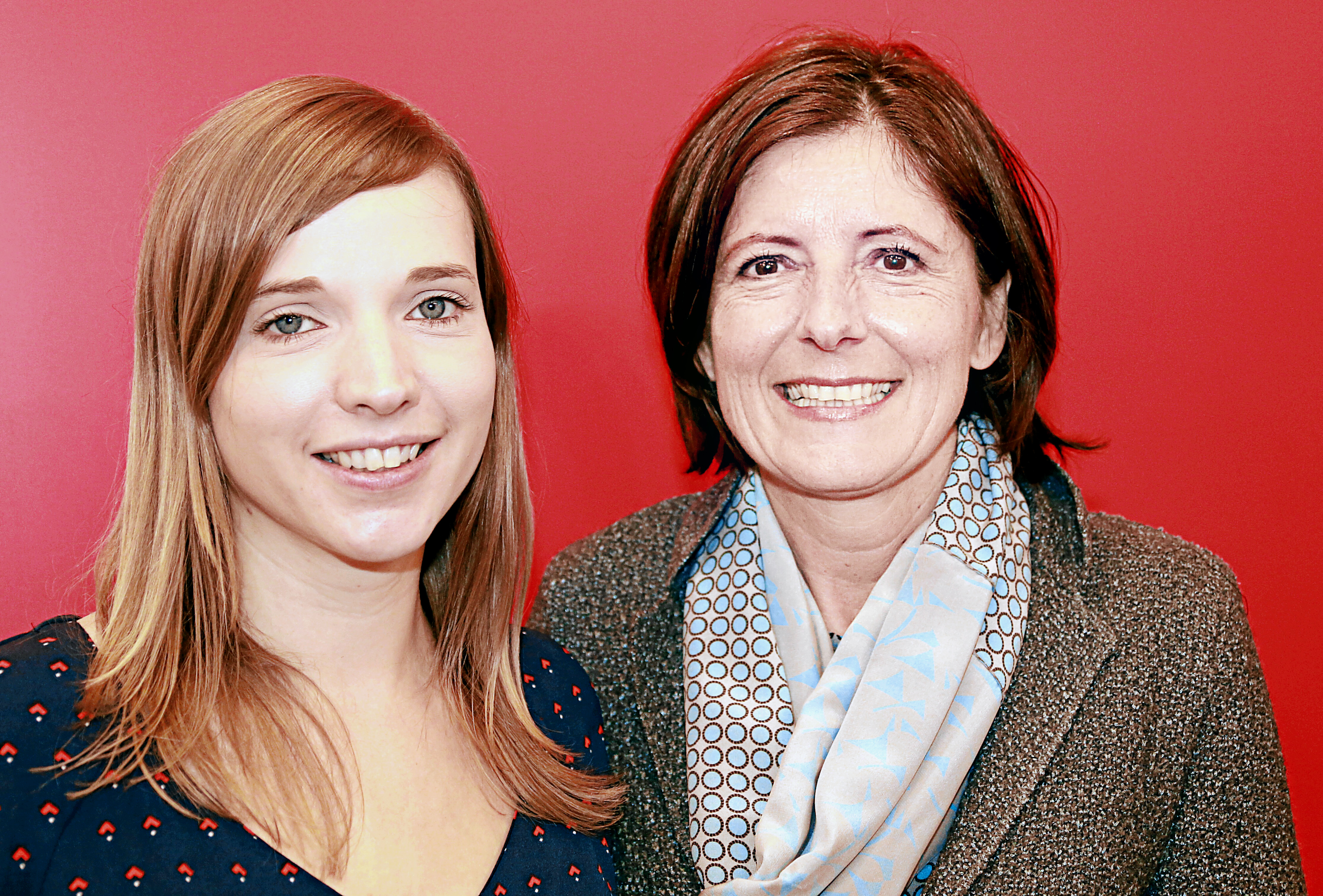
Wizorek with Malu Dreyer in 2014

Anne Wizorek (born 5 May 1981) is a German journalist, author and feminist.

== Life ==
In January 2013, she founded the blog Kleinerdrei. She was the editor-in-chief of the blog with Juliane Leopold from 2013 to December 2018 when it became defunct. In 2013, she along with other feminists created the hashtag #Aufschrei. The hashtag won the Grimme Online Award. Wizorek wrote a book the following year titled Weil ein #Aufschrei nicht reicht.

== Works ==
- Anne Wizorek, Weil ein #Aufschrei nicht reicht (Because an #outcry is not enough), 2014, ISBN 9783104030494
- Anne Wizorek, Generation müsy: Der Rückzug ins Private ist gefährlich (Generation müsy: Retreating into Private life is dangerous), 2015, ISBN 9783867744614
- Anne Wizorek and Hannah Lühmann, Gendern?! Gleichberechtigung in der Sprache - ein Für und ein Wider (Gender?! Equal Rights in Language - a Pros and Cons), 2018, ISBN 9783411756193

== See also ==
- Feminism in Germany
