= Aufschrei =

German hashtag

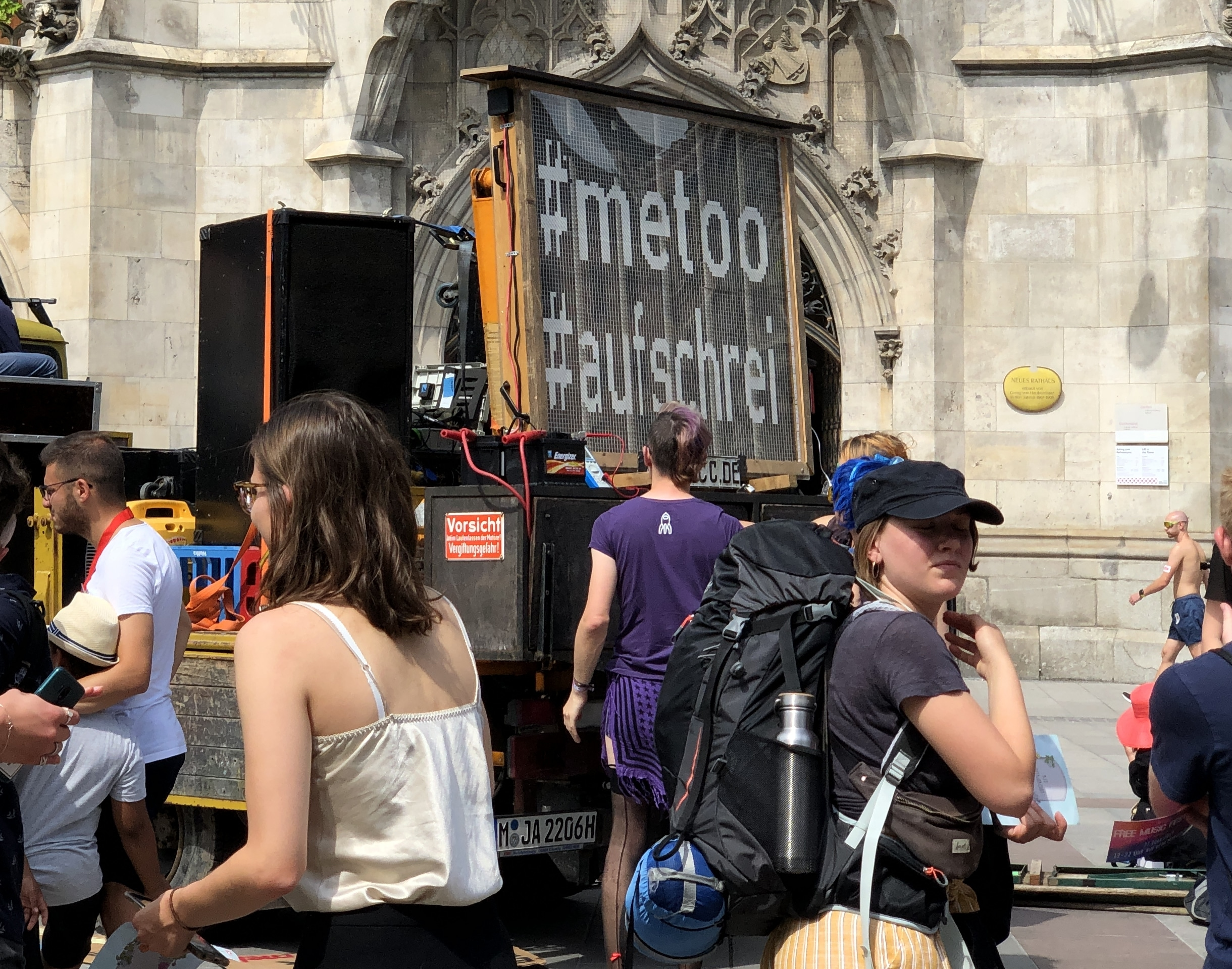
The hashtag in SlutWalk, Munich, 2019

#Aufschrei ("outcry") is a German hashtag which went viral on the social media platform Twitter in 2013 with the goal of raising awareness about experiences of sexism in Germany. The Tweets began to appear in response to the publication of an article in which journalist Laura Himmelreich describes an invasive encounter with politician Rainer Brüderle of Germany's Free Democratic Party (FDP); within the German public, these tweets triggered a national debate on sexism, particularly experiences of everyday sexism.

== Progression of the debate ==
On January 24, 2013, the German magazine Stern published an article by journalist Laura Himmelreich about the FDP's leading candidate for the 2013 federal election, Rainer Brüderle, in which she accuses the politician of sexually intrusive behavior. The announcement of the coming article, on January 23, 2013, marked the beginning of a sexism debate in Germany. Himmelreich's article was preceded by an article by Anett Meiritz, which appeared in the German magazine Spiegel and discussed misogyny in Germany's Pirate Party.

On January 24, 2013, after Twitter user Nicole von Horst posted about her own experiences with sexism, feminist Anne Wizorek, along with other young women, established the hashtag #aufschrei on Twitter, triggering an avalanche of Tweets about comments and actions which women perceived as sexist and which caused women to feel violated in their everyday lives. From January 21 to 27, 2013, the hashtag appeared in over 57,000 Twitter messages, however, some of them did not support the intentions of the hashtag's initiator. Thereafter, the sexism debate was also discussed in print media and television programs, such as in talks shows hosted by Markus Lanz, Maybrit Illner, and Günther Jauch as well as in the international press, and "spilled over as far as the U.S." Such publications as The New York Times reported and commented on the debate in numerous articles.

The term sexism was not used consistently in the subsequent debate, but rather, the debate devolved into a search for clear, authoritative rules for men in their interactions with women. In a column as well as a book, both titled Dann mach doch die Bluse zu! (eng. Then button up your blouse!), Birgit Kelle criticized the debate, suggesting that the evaluation of male behavior as either flirtatious or sexist depends on personal perceptions and is therefore random. According to her, if George Clooney, instead of Rainer Brüderle, had exchanged the exact same words with Laura Himmelreich, the conversation would probably have been interpreted in a totally different way. The topic of "sexism among (or against) men" also played a partial role in the debate, whereby power dynamics were critically discussed. In the magazine analyse & kritik (eng. analysis & critique), journalist Margarita Tsomou made the point that, within the discourse about society's relationship between homosexual, bisexual, and transgender people on one side and intersectionality on the other, women of color have been largely excluded. Several celebrities also took part in the debate, such as Anke Domscheit-Berg and Wolfgang Gründinger, who called for a discussion about "new gender ideals." In an interview one year after the campaign began, Wizorek called for a modern vision of masculinity. In September 2014, Anne Wizorek described the #aufschrei campaign in a book, which she presented as a kind of "quick, tech-savvy guide on all things feminist."

== "Tugendfuror" ==
At the start of March 2013, Germany's federal president, Joachim Gauck, commented on the affair in a conversation with Spiegel: "when such a Tugendfuror (eng. approx. 'rage of virtue') dominates the discussion, I am less moral than one might expect from me as a former priest." He further explains that there is certainly more work to do where women are concerned. "I cannot, however, acknowledge any especially egregious, widespread misbehavior of men towards women in our country." On the platform alltagssexismus.de, an open letter was published with a request for signatures, challenging Gauck to acknowledge the stories described in the #aufschrei Tweets, which could be read both on that webpage and on Twitter itself. The signatories took issue with the term Tugendfuror. Per the text of the letter, the worried "carries the same dismissive quality as 'hysteria,' and was clearly used to make women's anger seem laughable and to minimize their concerns as overly emotional. His words served to perpetuate centuries-old stereotypes about women – stereotypes which help to reinforce sexist structures and which stand in the way of gender equality."

Gauck's press secretary explained that the federal president does not, as a rule, respond to open letters, but intended to look into gender equality during his time in office. Later, Gauck attempted to defuse the conflict and, on the occasion of International Women's Day on March 8, declared that there "still exists disenfranchisement, even discrimination and sexism in our everyday lives." According to him, he would welcome "women as well as men – to conduct an engaging and serious debate."

One blogger wished that Gauck would "have to spend three months walking through German cities someday as a young woman at night" and, in her column, Christiane Jörges commented on his position, that with his "Tugendfuror" remark, he showed himself to be "an old man and a man of the old order."

== Grimme Online Award ==
On June 21, 2013, #aufschrei was recognized with a Grimme Online Award in their "special" category. In their explanatory statement, the jury emphasized that never before has a discussion, which began on a social-media platform, found such a wide audience in traditional media and in politics. The hashtag showed the importance of social media for social debates on important and polarizing topics. At the same time, the jury expressed their hope for a new "intertwined on- and offline culture of debate." Winners of this award included all "hashtag users who constructively discussed the problems of everyday sexism."

== Swiss #aufschrei ==
In October 2016, Switzerland also took part in a public debate about sexism and sexual violence. Unknown initiators began the discussion using the hashtag #schweizeraufschrei on Twitter. The movement was triggered by comments made in an interview by member of the National Council and former police officer Andrea Geissbühler (Swiss People's Party, SVP); specifically, she said that naïve women are complicit in their own rapes. On Twitter, women and men reacted with descriptions of sexual harassment in their everyday lives. Within a few days, over 1000 tweets were published with this hashtag. Even politicians reported on sexism in the federal parliament. The initiators continue to attempt to stimulate further public discussion by providing a kind of open-access blogging website.

== See also ==
- #ichhabnichtangezeigt
- #MeToo

== Literature ==
- Anne Wizorek: Weil ein Aufschrei nicht reicht – für einen Feminismus für heute. Fischer paperback, first edition, 2014, ISBN 978-3-596-03066-8
- Ulrike Lembke: Von Heideröslein bis Herrenwitz. Zu den kulturellen Wurzeln sexualisierter Gewalt. In: Blätter für deutsche und internationale Politik. Volume 58, No. 3, 2013, p. 53–63 (blaetter.de [accessed on August 7, 2013])
