= Sophie Mereau =

German writer (1770–1806)

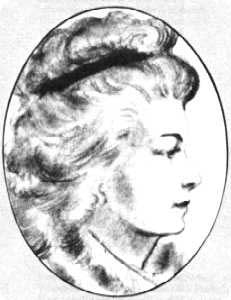
Sophie Mereau

Sophie Friederike Mereau (née Schubart; 27 March 1770 – 31 October 1806) was a writer associated with German Romanticism. Her maiden name was Schubart, but she did most of her work under the married name of Mereau. She also later married a second time, to writer Clemens Brentano, and took her husband's surname. She wrote novels, stories and poems, and she translated and published journals.

== Biography ==
Mereau was born as Sophie Friederike Schubart on 27 March 1770 in Altenburg. Mereau learned Spanish, French, English, and Italian at a young age. Her mother died when Mereau was 16, and her father died when she was 20. On 4 April 1793 she married Karl Mereau, moving to Jena where he was a lawyer. Through her husband she met Friedrich Schiller, who considered Mereau to be somewhat of a protégé. By 1794 she took her first lover. In 1795 she traveled with another lover to Berlin, shocking many in Jena high society. Mereau had two children with Karl, Gustav and Hulda. After the death of her first child, Gustav, she divorced Karl Mereau. The summer of 1800 she spent with relatives in Camburg. There she edited three literary journals, published poetry, wrote several stories, and finished her novel, Amanda und Eduard. Parts of Amanda und Eduard was published in Schiller's Die Horen. On 12 December 1802 she restarted her relationship with Clemens Brentano with whom she had an affair during her first marriage. Mereau only decided to marry Brentano when she became pregnant in November 1803 with their son, Achim Ariel born May 1804, who died six weeks after birth. The marriage was troubled and the couple spent time apart. In May 1805 her fourth child was born, but the baby died a few weeks later. Mereau's fifth child was a miscarriage and at this time she became ill. She converted to Catholicism and many scholars believe the time between her conversion and death were her happiest. Mereau died at 36 from a hemorrhage after delivering her sixth child.

== Writing and philosophy ==
Mereau first gained notoriety in 1791, and she was the only female student in Johann Gottlieb Fichte's private seminars. She was critical of some of his ideas on women, and her first novel in 1794 demonstrated his influence as well as the differences in her thinking. She was also a contemporary of Immanuel Kant. Her life-story, in part, has led her to be referred to as "one of the most fascinating figures of German Classicism and Romanticism."

== Publications ==
Sophie Mereau's published works as cited by An Encyclopedia of Continental Women Writers.

- Amanda und Eduard, 1803.
- Das Blüthenalter der Empfindung, 1794.
- Gedichte 2 volumes, 1800, 1802.
- Kalathiskos, 2 volumes, 1801–1802.
- "Lebe der Liebe und liebe das Leben." Der Briefwechsel von Clemens Brentano und Sophie Mereau, ed. Dagmar von Gersdorff, 1981.
- "Meine Seele ist bey euch geblieben." Briefe Sophie Brentanos an Henriette von Arnstein, ed. Karen Schench zu Schweinsberg, 1985.
