= Margarita Tsomou =

Greek-German artist (born 1977)

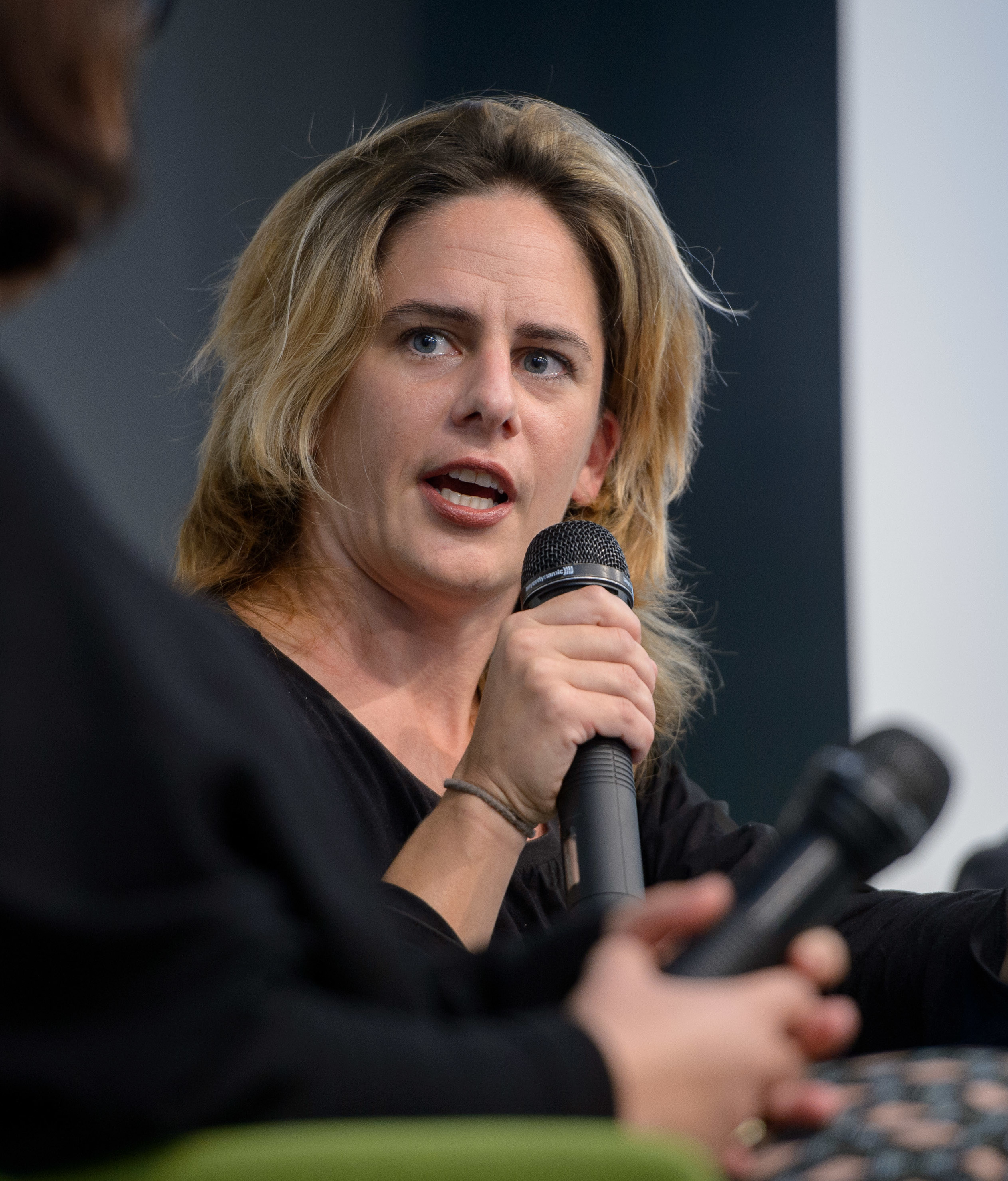
- Education: HafenCity University Hamburg
- Occupations: activist, dramaturgist, curator and professor

Margarita Tsomou (born 2 July 1977 in Thessaloniki) is a Greek-German dramaturgist, curator, performance artist, dancer and activist. She is an editor of pop feminist Missy Magazine, professor for contemporary theatre praxis at Osnabrück University of Applied Sciences and curator for theory and discourse at theatre and performance center Hebbel am Ufer in Berlin.

== Life ==
Tsomou graduated from the HafenCity University Hamburg. As part of her work, she helped organize the worldwide movement 2011 Occupy Athens.

In October 2018, she organized the stage program of demonstration Indivisible in Berlin. She is part of the artistic-activist group Schwabinggrad Ballet .

Tsomou works mainly on queer feminism and sexuality, political art and performance theory. Her work has appeared in Die Zeit, taz, Spex, Frankfurter Rundschau, WDR and SWR .
