= Elsa Herrmann =

Jewish German feminist writer and refugee advocate

- Born: Elsa Herrmann; January 9, 1893; Plauen, Saxony, German Empire
- Died: March 23, 1957 (aged 64)

Elsa Herrmann Pick (born Elsa Herrmann, January 9, 1893 – March 23, 1957, also known as Dr. Elsa Pickova) was a Jewish German feminist writer and refugee advocate. She is best known for her 1929 book This is the New Woman (So ist die neue Frau in the original German).

== Biography ==
Herrmann was born in Plauen, Saxony to a Jewish merchant family. She attended a Jewish secondary school (Höhere Israelitische Bürgerschule) before enrolling at Leipzig University.

She studied under Dr. Hugo Gaudig for some time before becoming the first Jewish doctoral student in law at the University of Leipzig, where she earned her Ph.D. in 1919. On behalf of the aid organization Deutscher Zentralausschuss für die Auslandshilfe (German Central Committee for Foreign Aid) Herrmann wrote to Albert Einstein in 1920, who responded with a thank-you letter for the Quaker American Friends Service Committee for their food aid program. In 1929 Herrmann published a book about emancipated modern women titled So ist die neue Frau (This is the New Woman in English) at Avalun in Berlin.

After the National Socialists came to power in 1933, Elsa Herrmann moved to a Czech border town in Bohemia. She was married there on December 16, 1933 to Bedrich Goder, a Czech man 15 years her junior. In February 1934 the couple moved to Prague, but the marriage was short lived. On May 18, 1934 Elsa married Karel Pick (1880–1950). From then on she was known as Dr. Elsa Pick.

In November 1934, Pick began to hold lectures on topics such as "women in the economic crisis." However, as anti-Jewish violence escalated throughout Germany, Austria, and Czechoslovakia, she emigrated to Birmingham, England, before the summer of 1940.

During her time in Britain, Pick published articles in London magazines. In 1943, she published a letter from Birmingham through the Austrian Center in London for the Zeitenspiegel (Mirror of the Times), which was printed in the "Rescue Measures for Jews" section of the magazine. In that article she also mentioned the death of her mother, who had died after being transported from a ghetto in Vogtland, Germany, where she had lived for two years, to the Treblinka concentration camp, where she died in September 1942. Pick did not learn of her mother's death until January 1943.

In March 1951, Pick was issued a passport by the British Foreign Office. That same year she moved to Munich, Germany, her husband having died the year before.

While visiting her brother, Pick collapsed and was sent to the hospital. She died there at age 64, on March 23, 1957.

== Publications ==
- Die Trennung von Kirche und Staat im Frankfurter Parlament (Ph.D. thesis, Leipzig, 1919)
- So ist die neue Frau (Hellerau: Avalun, 1929), 170 pages (online at Hathitrust)
