= Protestant Women in Germany =

Umbrella group of German Protestant women's organizations

Protestant Women in Germany (Evangelische Frauen in Deutschland or EFiD) is an ecumenical umbrella group of 40 German Protestant (evangelical) women's organizations. Its headquarters is in Hanover, and it was founded in 2008. It represents about three million German women. Its predecessor groups were Evangelische Frauenhilfe in Deutschland (1899-2008) and Evangelische Frauenarbeit in Deutschland (1918-2007).
