= Greng =

- Municipality
- Coat of arms
- Location of Greng
- Location within Switzerland Location within Canton of Fribourg
- Coordinates: 46°55′N 7°6′E
- Country: Switzerland
- Canton: Fribourg
- District: See

Government
  - Executive: Gemeinderat with 5 members
  - Mayor: Ammann

Area
  - Total: 1.01 km^{2} (0.39 sq mi)
- Elevation: 439 m (1,440 ft)

Population (December 2020)
  - Total: 178
  - Density: 176/km^{2} (456/sq mi)
- Time zone: UTC+01:00 (CET)
  - Summer (DST): UTC+02:00 (CEST)
- Postal code: 3280
- SFOS number: 2261
- ISO 3166 code: CH-FR
- Surrounded by: Courgevaux, Faoug (VD), Haut-Vully, Meyriez, Mur (VD), Murten/Morat
- Website: www.greng.ch

Greng is a municipality in the district of See/Lac in the canton of Fribourg in Switzerland.

== History ==
Greng is first mentioned in 1349 as Groyn.

== Geography ==
Greng has an area, as of 2009, of 1 square kilometer (0.39 mi^{2}). Of this area, 0.74 km^{2} (0.29 mi^{2}) or 76.3% is used for agricultural purposes, while 0.1 km^{2} (0.039 mi^{2}) or 10.3% is forested. Of the rest of the land, 0.14 km^{2} (35 acres) or 14.4% is settled (buildings or roads) and 0.03 km^{2} (7.4 acres) or 3.1% is unproductive land.

Of the built up area, housing and buildings made up 11.3% and transportation infrastructure made up 3.1%. Out of the forested land, 8.2% of the total land area is heavily forested and 2.1% is covered with orchards or small clusters of trees. Of the agricultural land, 60.8% is used for growing crops and 15.5% is pastures.

The municipality is located in the See/Lac district, on the eastern shore of Lake Morat about 2 km (1.2 mi) south-west of Murten/Morat. It consists of the hamlets of Greng-dessus and Greng-dessous.

== Coat of arms ==
The blazon of the municipal coat of arms is Or a Mill-wheel Sable.

== Demographics ==
Greng has a population (as of December 2020) of 178. As of 2008, 13.1% of the population are resident foreign nationals. Over the last 10 years (2000–2010) the population has changed at a rate of 1.9%. Migration accounted for 5.8%, while births and deaths accounted for 7.7%.

Most of the population (as of 2000) speaks German (138 or 92.0%) as their first language, French is the second most common (8 or 5.3%) and Italian is the third (1 or 0.7%).

As of 2008, the population was 53.4% male and 46.6% female. The population was made up of 68 Swiss men (45.9% of the population) and 11 (7.4%) non-Swiss men. There were 62 Swiss women (41.9%) and 7 (4.7%) non-Swiss women. Of the population in the municipality, 23 or about 15.3% were born in Greng and lived there in 2000. There were 21 or 14.0% who were born in the same canton, while 90 or 60.0% were born somewhere else in Switzerland, and 13 or 8.7% were born outside of Switzerland.

As of 2000, children and teenagers (0–19 years old) make up 24.7% of the population, while adults (20–64 years old) make up 66.7% and seniors (over 64 years old) make up 8.7%.

As of 2000, there were 59 people who were single and never married in the municipality. There were 72 married individuals, 5 widows or widowers and 14 individuals who are divorced.

As of 2000, there were 65 private households in the municipality, and an average of 2.3 persons per household. There were 20 households that consist of only one person and 6 households with five or more people. In 2000, a total of 54 apartments (78.3% of the total) were permanently occupied, while 14 apartments (20.3%) were seasonally occupied and one apartment was empty.

The historical population is given in the following chart:

== Heritage sites of national significance ==
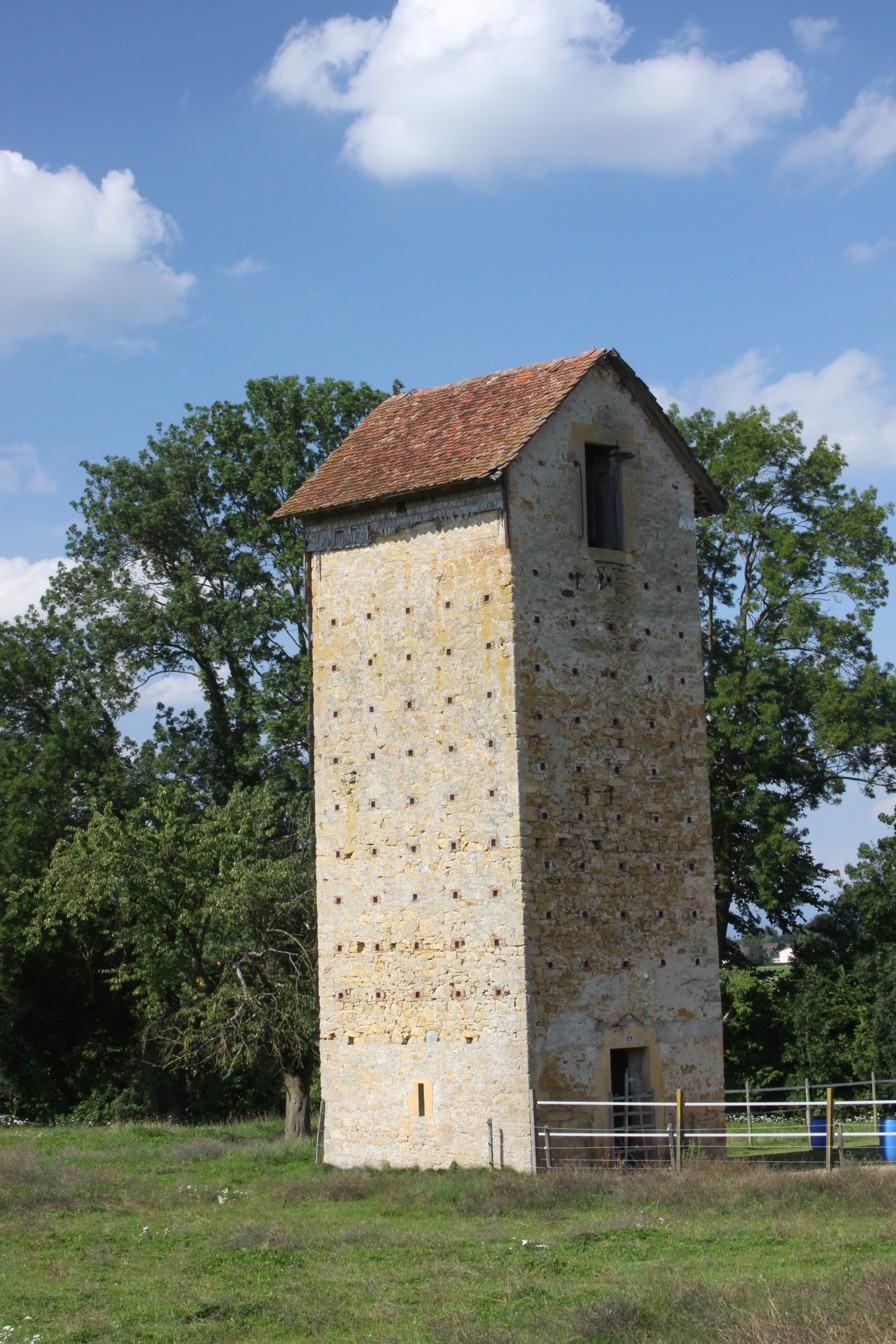
Turmspeicher

The archeological site at Greng-Spitz and the Turmspeicher (storage tower) are listed as Swiss heritage site of national significance.

=== World heritage site ===
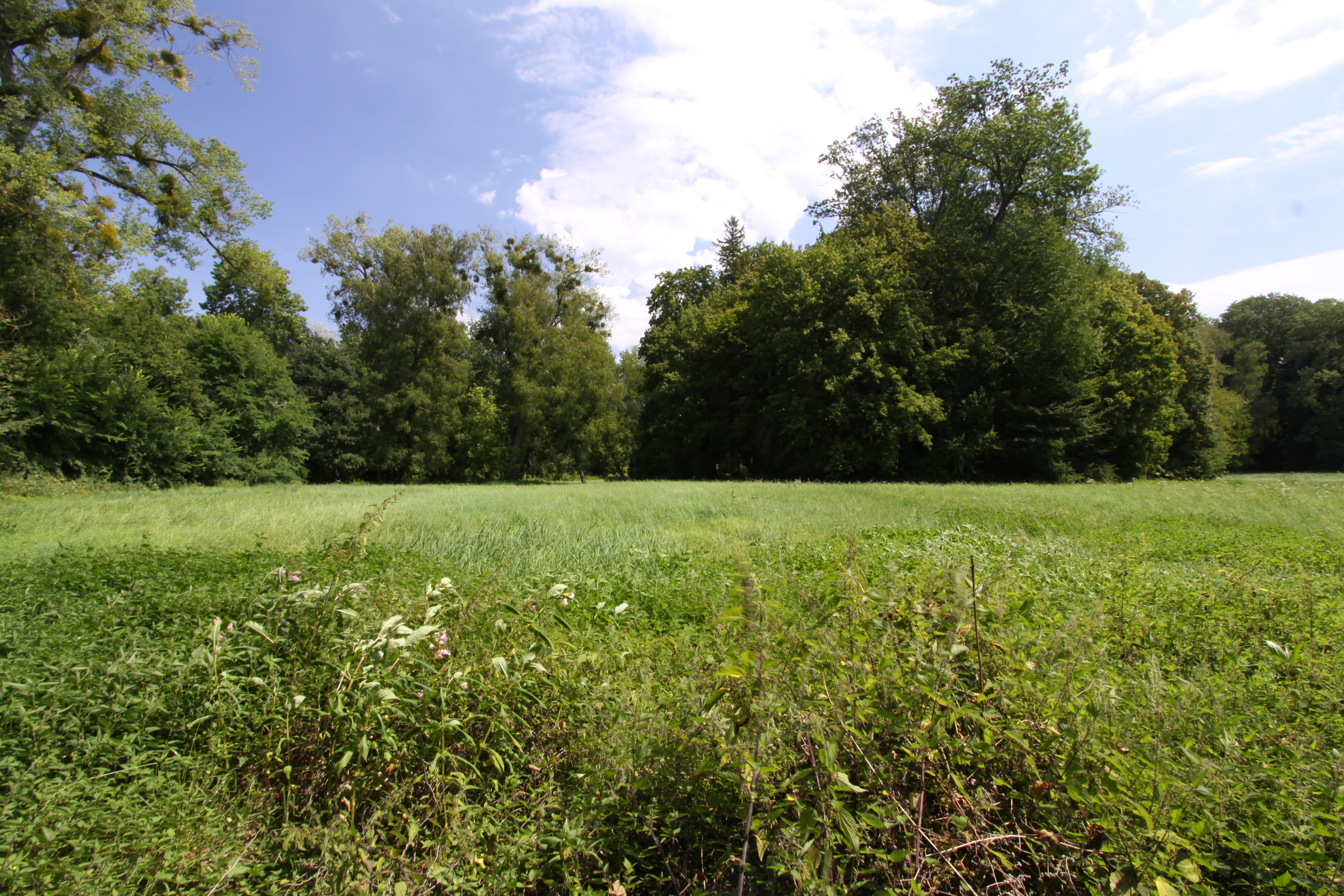
Meadow at Greng-Spitz

It is home to the Spitz prehistoric pile-dwelling (or stilt house) settlements that are part of the Prehistoric Pile dwellings around the Alps UNESCO World Heritage Site.

The Greng-Spitz site has been studied since the 19th century. It was occupied at least three separate times. The village sites are all located on a peninsula that juts out into Lake Morat. Before the Jura water correction projects of the 19th century, the peninsula often became an island as the water levels in the lake changed. The earliest settlement was from a Cortaillod culture during the middle Neolithic and was located on the north-west of the peninsula. Some of the timbers from this era have been dendrochronologically dated to 3864-3820 BC. The second settlement was a final Neolithic settlement on the south-eastern part of the peninsula. The final settlement was a Bronze Age village located back on the north-west of the peninsula. The timbers from this site have been dated to 1058 to 954 BC. Many of the artifacts which were discovered at Greng-Spitz are on display at the Museum on Murten/Morat.

== Politics ==
In the 2011 federal election the most popular party was the SVP which received 46.9% of the vote. The next three most popular parties were the FDP (15.3%), the Green Liberal Party (8.1%) and the SPS (7.7%).

The SVP lost about 12.9% of the vote when compared to the 2007 Federal election (59.8% in 2007 vs 46.9% in 2011). The FDP retained about the same popularity (18.6% in 2007), the Green Liberal Party moved from below fourth place in 2007 to third and the SPS retained about the same popularity (6.6% in 2007). A total of 76 votes were cast in this election, of which 1 or 1.3% was invalid.

== Economy ==
As of 2010, Greng had an unemployment rate of 1.9%. As of 2008, there were 20 people employed in the primary economic sector and about 3 businesses involved in this sector. No one was employed in the secondary sector. 54 people were employed in the tertiary sector, with 24 businesses in this sector. There were 93 residents of the municipality who were employed in some capacity, of which females made up 39.8% of the workforce.

In 2008 the total number of full-time equivalent jobs was 60. The number of jobs in the primary sector was 14, all of which were in agriculture. There were no jobs in the secondary sector. The number of jobs in the tertiary sector was 46. In the tertiary sector; 10 or 21.7% were in wholesale or retail sales or the repair of motor vehicles, 1 was in the movement and storage of goods, 3 or 6.5% were in a hotel or restaurant, 5 or 10.9% were in the information industry, 3 or 6.5% were the insurance or financial industry and 12 or 26.1% were technical professionals or scientists.

In 2000, there were 15 workers who commuted into the municipality and 65 workers who commuted away. The municipality is a net exporter of workers, with about 4.3 workers leaving the municipality for every one entering. Of the working population, 6.5% used public transportation to get to work, and 61.3% used a private car.

== Religion ==
From the 2000 census, 36 or 24.0% were Roman Catholic, while 80 or 53.3% belonged to the Swiss Reformed Church. There were 1 individual who belonged to another church. 31 (or about 20.67% of the population) belonged to no church, are agnostic or atheist, and 2 individuals (or about 1.33% of the population) did not answer the question.

== Education ==
In Greng about 53 or (35.3%) of the population have completed non-mandatory upper secondary education, and 47 or (31.3%) have completed additional higher education (either university or a Fachhochschule). Of the 47 who completed tertiary schooling, 68.1% were Swiss men, 23.4% were Swiss women.

The Canton of Fribourg school system provides one year of non-obligatory Kindergarten, followed by six years of Primary school. This is followed by three years of obligatory lower Secondary school where the students are separated according to ability and aptitude. Following the lower Secondary students may attend a three or four year optional upper Secondary school. The upper Secondary school is divided into gymnasium (university preparatory) and vocational programs. After they finish the upper Secondary program, students may choose to attend a Tertiary school or continue their apprenticeship.

During the 2010-11 school year, there were no students attending school in Greng, but a total of 20 students attended school in other municipalities. Of these students, 2 were in kindergarten, 11 were in a primary school, 4 were in a mandatory secondary school and 3 were in an upper secondary school. were in a vocational secondary program. There were no tertiary students from this municipality.

As of 2000, there were 2 students in Greng who came from another municipality, while 20 residents attended schools outside the municipality.
