= Gempenach =

- Former municipality
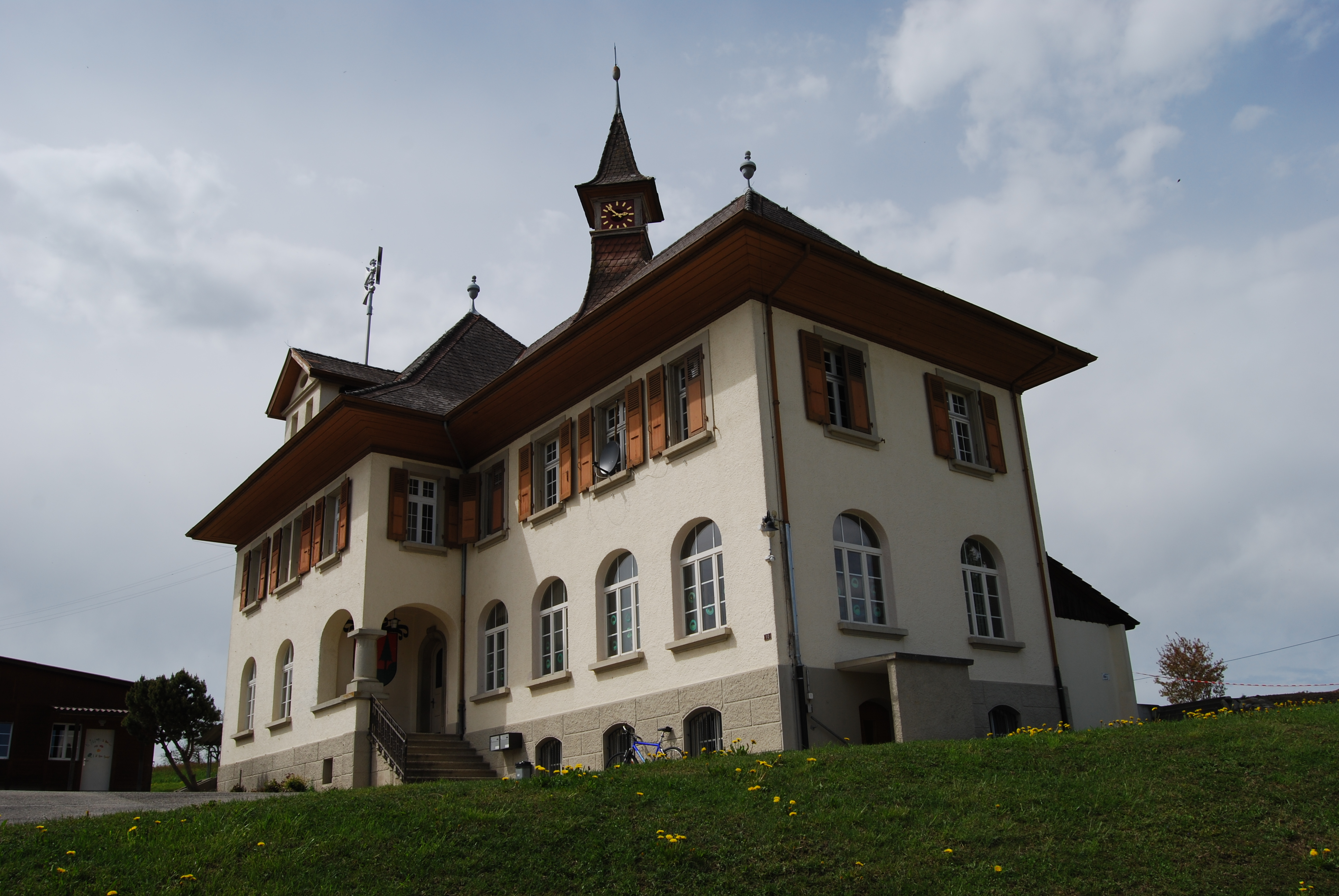

- Coat of arms
- Location of Gempenach
- Location within Switzerland Location within Canton of Fribourg
- Coordinates: 46°56′N 7°12′E
- Country: Switzerland
- Canton: Fribourg
- District: See

Government
  - Executive: Gemeinderat with 5 members
  - Mayor: Ammann

Area
  - Total: 1.66 km^{2} (0.64 sq mi)
- Elevation: 501 m (1,644 ft)

Population (December 2020)
  - Total: 314
  - Density: 189/km^{2} (490/sq mi)
- Time zone: UTC+01:00 (CET)
  - Summer (DST): UTC+02:00 (CEST)
- Postal code: 3215
- SFOS number: 2260
- ISO 3166 code: CH-FR
- Surrounded by: Agriswil, Büchslen, Ferenbalm (BE), Lurtigen, Ried bei Kerzers, Ulmiz
- Website: SFSO statistics

Gempenach (former French name: Champagny; Arpitan: Champagni [tsɑ̃paˈɲi]) is a former municipality in the district of See in the canton of Fribourg in Switzerland. On 1 January 2022 the former municipalities of Galmiz, Gempenach and Clavaleyres (Canton of Bern) merged into the municipality of Murten.

== History ==
Gempenach is first mentioned under its French name in 1340 as Champagnie. In 1408 it was mentioned as Gempenach followed in 1409 as Gempernach.

== Geography ==
Gempenach has an area, as of 2009, of 1.7 square kilometers (0.66 mi^{2}). Of this area, 1.25 km^{2} (0.48 mi^{2}) or 74.0% is used for agricultural purposes, while 0.31 km^{2} (0.12 mi^{2}) or 18.3% is forested. Of the rest of the land, 0.1 km^{2} (25 acres) or 5.9% is settled (buildings or roads).

Of the built up area, housing and buildings made up 2.4% and transportation infrastructure made up 3.0%. Out of the forested land, 17.2% of the total land area is heavily forested and 1.2% is covered with orchards or small clusters of trees. Of the agricultural land, 55.6% is used for growing crops and 12.4% is pastures, while 5.9% is used for orchards or vine crops.

The municipality is located in the See/Lac district, about 6 km (3.7 mi) north-east of Murten along the border with the Canton of Bern. It consists of the linear village of Gempenach.

== Coat of arms ==
The blazon of the municipal coat of arms is Gules a House Argent to its sinister a pine tree Vert trunked proper and issuant from sinister a Bush of the Third all issuant from a Base of the last.

== Demographics ==
Gempenach has a population (as of December 2020) of 314. As of 2008, 9.8% of the population are resident foreign nationals. Over the last 10 years (2000–2010) the population has changed at a rate of 5.8%. Migration accounted for 11.6%, while births and deaths accounted for -1.1%.

Most of the population (as of 2000) speaks German (274 or 97.5%) as their first language, Portuguese is the second most common (4 or 1.4%) and French is the third (2 or 0.7%).

As of 2008, the population was 50.5% male and 49.5% female. The population was made up of 129 Swiss men (44.3% of the population) and 18 (6.2%) non-Swiss men. There were 135 Swiss women (46.4%) and 9 (3.1%) non-Swiss women. Of the population in the municipality, 87 or about 31.0% were born in Gempenach and lived there in 2000. There were 38 or 13.5% who were born in the same canton, while 134 or 47.7% were born somewhere else in Switzerland, and 13 or 4.6% were born outside of Switzerland.

As of 2000, children and teenagers (0–19 years old) make up 31% of the population, while adults (20–64 years old) make up 59.4% and seniors (over 64 years old) make up 9.6%.

As of 2000, there were 121 people who were single and never married in the municipality. There were 141 married individuals, 10 widows or widowers and 9 individuals who are divorced.

As of 2000, there were 108 private households in the municipality, and an average of 2.6 persons per household. There were 29 households that consist of only one person and 10 households with five or more people. In 2000, a total of 105 apartments (92.9% of the total) were permanently occupied, while 6 apartments (5.3%) were seasonally occupied and 2 apartments (1.8%) were empty. The vacancy rate for the municipality, in 2010, was 0.83%.

The historical population is given in the following chart:

== Politics ==
In the 2011 federal election the most popular party was the SVP which received 53.9% of the vote. The next three most popular parties were the SPS (10.5%), the BDP/PBD (8.1%) and the FDP (7.5%).

The SVP received about the same percentage of the vote as they did in the 2007 Federal election (55.9% in 2007 vs 53.9% in 2011). The SPS moved from third in 2007 (with 9.1%) to second in 2011, the BDP moved from below fourth place in 2007 to third and the FDP moved from second in 2007 (with 14.1%) to fourth. A total of 97 votes were cast in this election.

== Economy ==
As of 2010, Gempenach had an unemployment rate of 1.4%. As of 2008, there were 48 people employed in the primary economic sector and about 10 businesses involved in this sector. 21 people were employed in the secondary sector and there were 2 businesses in this sector. 41 people were employed in the tertiary sector, with 11 businesses in this sector. There were 150 residents of the municipality who were employed in some capacity, of which females made up 40.0% of the workforce.

In 2008 the total number of full-time equivalent jobs was 92. The number of jobs in the primary sector was 39, all of which were in agriculture. The number of jobs in the secondary sector was 21 of which 1 was in manufacturing and 20 (95.2%) were in construction. The number of jobs in the tertiary sector was 32. In the tertiary sector; 6 or 18.8% were in wholesale or retail sales or the repair of motor vehicles, 8 or 25.0% were in the movement and storage of goods, 10 or 31.3% were in a hotel or restaurant, 3 or 9.4% were in the information industry, 4 or 12.5% were in education.

In 2000, there were 18 workers who commuted into the municipality and 98 workers who commuted away. The municipality is a net exporter of workers, with about 5.4 workers leaving the municipality for every one entering. Of the working population, 8.7% used public transportation to get to work, and 62% used a private car.

== Religion ==
From the 2000 census, 26 or 9.3% were Roman Catholic, while 229 or 81.5% belonged to the Swiss Reformed Church. Of the rest of the population, there were 12 individuals (or about 4.27% of the population) who belonged to another Christian church. There were 2 individuals who were Buddhist. 14 (or about 4.98% of the population) belonged to no church, are agnostic or atheist, and 4 individuals (or about 1.42% of the population) did not answer the question.

== Education ==
In Gempenach about 97 or (34.5%) of the population have completed non-mandatory upper secondary education, and 34 or (12.1%) have completed additional higher education (either university or a Fachhochschule). Of the 34 who completed tertiary schooling, 82.4% were Swiss men, 14.7% were Swiss women.

The Canton of Fribourg school system provides one year of non-obligatory Kindergarten, followed by six years of Primary school. This is followed by three years of obligatory lower Secondary school where the students are separated according to ability and aptitude. Following the lower Secondary students may attend a three or four year optional upper Secondary school. The upper Secondary school is divided into gymnasium (university preparatory) and vocational programs. After they finish the upper Secondary program, students may choose to attend a Tertiary school or continue their apprenticeship.

During the 2010-11 school year, there were a total of 44 students attending 2 classes in Gempenach. A total of 40 students from the municipality attended any school, either in the municipality or outside of it. The municipality had 2 primary classes and 44 students. During the same year, there were no lower secondary classes in the municipality, but 19 students attended lower secondary school in a neighboring municipality. There were no upper Secondary classes or vocational classes, but there were 3 upper Secondary students and 3 upper Secondary vocational students who attended classes in another municipality. The municipality had no non-university Tertiary classes. who attended classes in another municipality.

As of 2000, there were 20 students in Gempenach who came from another municipality, while 46 residents attended schools outside the municipality.
