= Büchslen =

- Former municipality
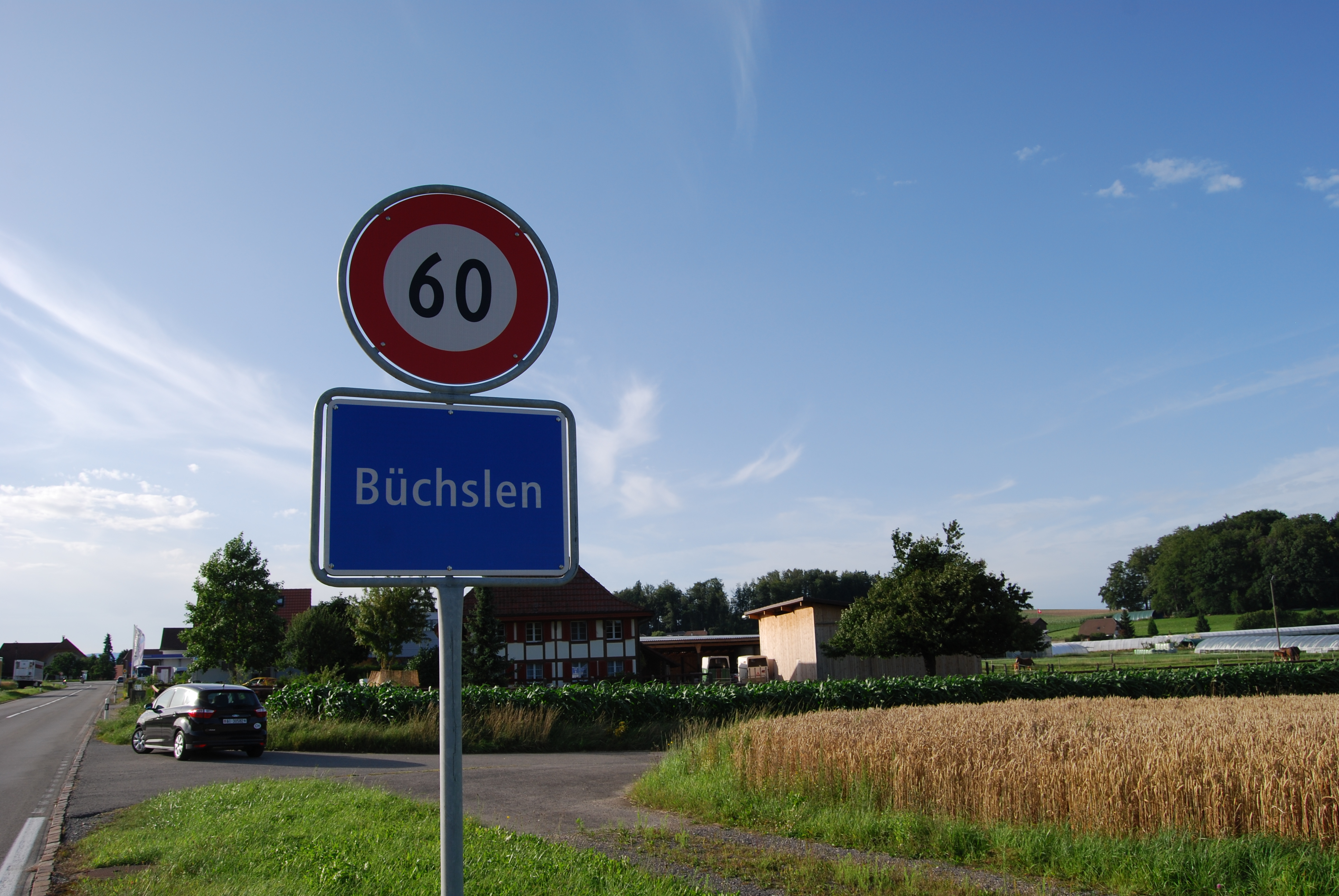

- Coat of arms
- Location of Büchslen
- Location within Switzerland Location within Canton of Fribourg
- Coordinates: 46°57′N 7°11′E
- Country: Switzerland
- Canton: Fribourg
- District: See

Area
  - Total: 1.61 km^{2} (0.62 sq mi)
- Elevation: 511 m (1,677 ft)

Population (Dec 2010)
  - Total: 177
  - Density: 110/km^{2} (285/sq mi)
- Time zone: UTC+01:00 (CET)
  - Summer (DST): UTC+02:00 (CEST)
- Postal code: 3215
- SFOS number: 2244
- ISO 3166 code: CH-FR
- Surrounded by: Galmiz, Gempenach, Lurtigen, Murten/Morat, Ried bei Kerzers
- Website: SFSO statistics

Büchslen (French: Buchillon) is a former municipality in the district of See in the canton of Fribourg in Switzerland. On 1 January 2013 the former municipality of Büchslen merged into the municipality of Morat.

== History ==
Büchslen is first mentioned in 1339 as Buchillion. Until the 18th century it was known as Bichslen.

== Geography ==
Before the merger, Büchslen had a total area of 1.6 km^{2} (0.62 mi^{2}). Of this area, 1.26 km^{2} (0.49 mi^{2}) or 81.3% is used for agricultural purposes, while 0.21 km^{2} (0.081 mi^{2}) or 13.5% is forested. Of the rest of the land, 0.14 km^{2} (35 acres) or 9.0% is settled (buildings or roads).

Of the built up area, housing and buildings made up 3.9% and transportation infrastructure made up 4.5%. Out of the forested land, all of the forested land area is covered with heavy forests. Of the agricultural land, 64.5% is used for growing crops and 10.3% is pastures, while 6.5% is used for orchards or vine crops.

The municipality is located in the See/Lac district, on the old Murten-Bern highway.

== Coat of arms ==
The blazon of the municipal coat of arms is Azure, two matchlocks rifles proper in saltire. This is an example of canting arms since the German term Büchse means a hunting rifle.

== Demographics ==
Büchslen had a population (as of 2010) of 177. As of 2008, 4.1% of the population are resident foreign nationals. Over the last 10 years (2000–2010) the population has changed at a rate of 7.7%. Migration accounted for 0.6%, while births and deaths accounted for 8.4%.

Most of the population (as of 2000) speaks German (149 or 96.8%) as their first language, French is the second most common (3 or 1.9%) and Italian is the third (2 or 1.3%).

As of 2008, the population was 46.2% male and 53.8% female. The population was made up of 74 Swiss men (43.8% of the population) and 4 (2.4%) non-Swiss men. There were 88 Swiss women (52.1%) and 3 (1.8%) non-Swiss women. Of the population in the municipality, 49 or about 31.8% were born in Büchslen and lived there in 2000. There were 20 or 13.0% who were born in the same canton, while 76 or 49.4% were born somewhere else in Switzerland, and 6 or 3.9% were born outside of Switzerland.

As of 2000, children and teenagers (0–19 years old) make up 22.1% of the population, while adults (20–64 years old) make up 66.2% and seniors (over 64 years old) make up 11.7%.

As of 2000, there were 62 people who were single and never married in the municipality. There were 77 married individuals, 10 widows or widowers and 5 individuals who are divorced.

As of 2000, there were 57 private households in the municipality, and an average of 2.7 persons per household. There were 11 households that consist of only one person and 4 households with five or more people. In 2000, a total of 56 apartments (94.9% of the total) were permanently occupied, while 2 apartments (3.4%) were seasonally occupied and one apartment was empty.

The historical population is given in the following chart:

== Politics ==
In the 2011 federal election the most popular party was the SVP which received 39.8% of the vote. The next three most popular parties were the CVP (14.1%), the FDP (13.1%) and the SPS (12.5%). The SVP lost about 12.2% of the vote when compared to the 2007 Federal election (52.0% in 2007 vs 39.8% in 2011). The CVP moved from third in 2007 (with 11.3%) to second in 2011, the FDP moved from second in 2007 (with 18.3%) to third and the SPS moved from below fourth place in 2007 to fourth. A total of 73 votes were cast in this election, of which 1 or 1.4% was invalid.

== Economy ==
As of 2010, Büchslen had an unemployment rate of 0.5%. As of 2008, there were 39 people employed in the primary economic sector and about 9 businesses involved in this sector. 18 people were employed in the secondary sector and there was 1 business in this sector. 47 people were employed in the tertiary sector, with 4 businesses in this sector. There were 90 residents of the municipality who were employed in some capacity, of which females made up 35.6% of the workforce.

In 2008 the total number of full-time equivalent jobs was 92. The number of jobs in the primary sector was 33, all of which were in agriculture. The number of jobs in the secondary sector was 16, all of which were in manufacturing. The number of jobs in the tertiary sector was 43. In the tertiary sector; 39 or 90.7% were in wholesale or retail sales or the repair of motor vehicles, 3 or 7.0% were in a hotel or restaurant, 1 was a technical professional or scientist, .

In 2000, there were 36 workers who commuted into the municipality and 61 workers who commuted away. The municipality is a net exporter of workers, with about 1.7 workers leaving the municipality for every one entering. Of the working population, 5.6% used public transportation to get to work, and 58.9% used a private car.

== Religion ==
From the 2000 census, 13 or 8.4% were Roman Catholic, while 113 or 73.4% belonged to the Swiss Reformed Church. Of the rest of the population, there were 2 individuals (or about 1.30% of the population) who belonged to the Christian Catholic Church, and there were 32 individuals (or about 20.78% of the population) who belonged to another Christian church. 9 (or about 5.84% of the population) belonged to no church, are agnostic or atheist, and 1 individuals (or about 0.65% of the population) did not answer the question.

== Education ==
In Büchslen about 83 or (53.9%) of the population have completed non-mandatory upper secondary education, and 14 or (9.1%) have completed additional higher education (either university or a Fachhochschule). Of the 14 who completed tertiary schooling, 85.7% were Swiss men, 14.3% were Swiss women.

The Canton of Fribourg school system provides one year of non-obligatory Kindergarten, followed by six years of Primary school. This is followed by three years of obligatory lower Secondary school where the students are separated according to ability and aptitude. Following the lower Secondary students may attend a three or four year optional upper Secondary school. The upper Secondary school is divided into gymnasium (university preparatory) and vocational programs. After they finish the upper Secondary program, students may choose to attend a Tertiary school or continue their apprenticeship.

During the 2010-11 school year, there were no students attending school in Büchslen, but a total of 23 students attended school in other municipalities. Of these students, 4 were in kindergarten, 14 were in a primary school, 3 were in a mandatory secondary school, were in an upper secondary school and 2 were in a vocational secondary program. There were no tertiary students from this municipality.

As of 2000, there were 20 students from Büchslen who attended schools outside the municipality.
