= Burg bei Murten =

Village and former municipality in the canton of Fribourg, Switzerland

Coordinates: 46°55′44″N 7°8′31″E

Burg bei Murten is a village and former municipality in the district of Broye in the canton of Fribourg, Switzerland.

It was first recorded in 1340 as Chastel. It has also had the Italian names Castro (1394), Castro villa (1413) and then the German form Burg (1510).

The municipality had 216 inhabitants in 1850, which decreased to 187 in 1880. After an increase to 246 in 1900 it declined again, to 187 in 1950 and 167 in 1970.

In 1975 the municipality was incorporated into the larger, neighboring municipality Murten.
