= Ried bei Kerzers =

- Municipality
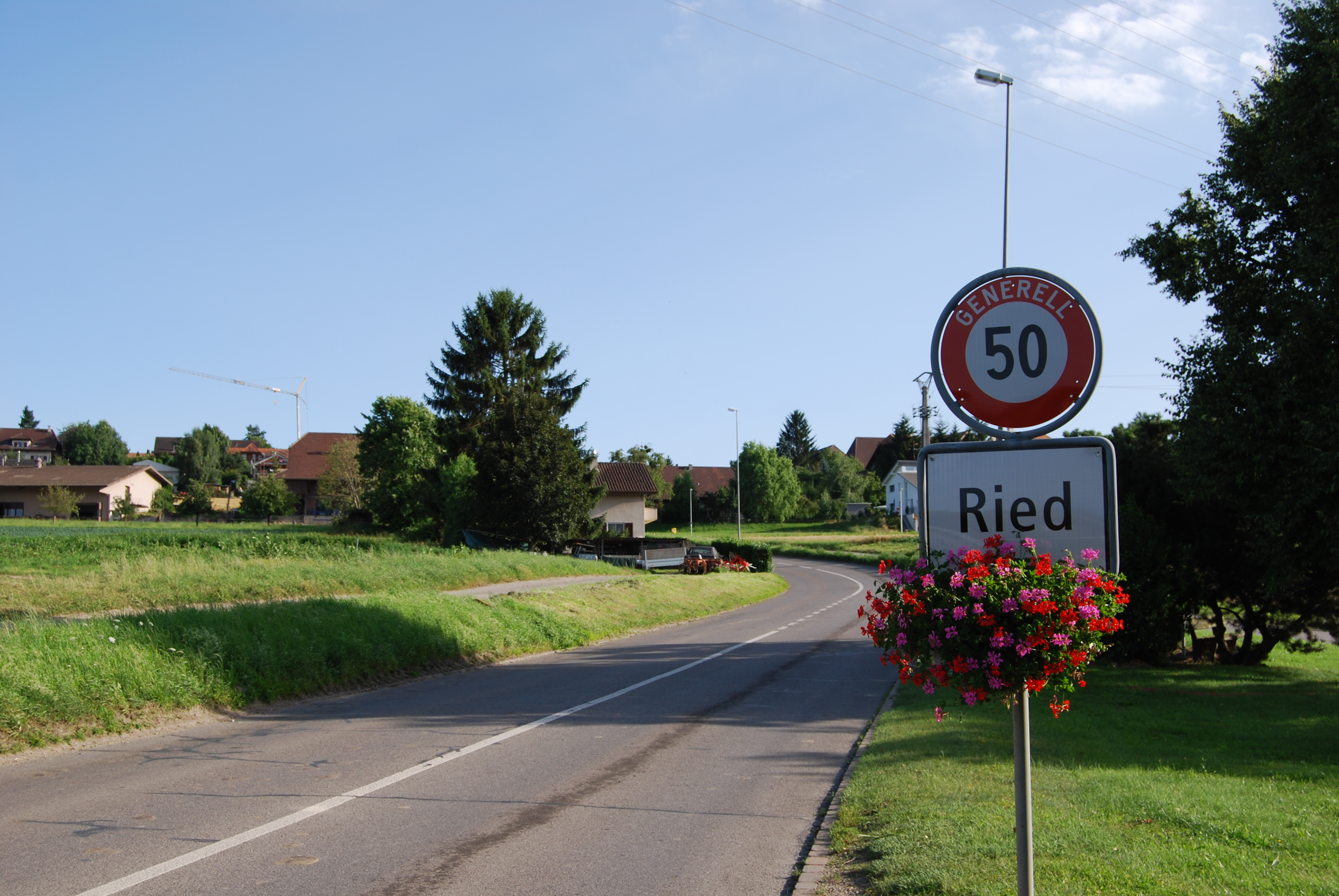

- Coat of arms
- Location of Ried bei Kerzers
- Location within Switzerland Location within Canton of Fribourg
- Coordinates: 46°57′N 7°11′E
- Country: Switzerland
- Canton: Fribourg
- District: See

Government
  - Executive: Gemeinderat with 7 members
  - Mayor: Ammann

Area
  - Total: 7.57 km^{2} (2.92 sq mi)
- Elevation: 511 m (1,677 ft)

Population (December 2020)
  - Total: 1,229
  - Density: 162/km^{2} (420/sq mi)
- Time zone: UTC+01:00 (CET)
  - Summer (DST): UTC+02:00 (CEST)
- Postal code: 3216
- SFOS number: 2276
- ISO 3166 code: CH-FR
- Surrounded by: Agriswil, Büchslen, Galmiz, Gempenach, Gurbrü (BE), Kerzers, Münchenwiler (BE), Murten/Morat
- Website: www.ried.ch

Ried bei Kerzers (French: Essert; Arpitan: Èssèrts [eˈʃɛ]) is a municipality in the district of See, within the canton of Fribourg, Switzerland. It is one of the municipalities with a large majority of German speakers in the mostly French speaking Canton of Fribourg.

On 1 January 2006, Ried bei Kerzers incorporated the neighbouring municipality of Agriswil.

In 2008, Swiss media reported that one of the US presidents, Barack Obama had Swiss ancestry on his mother's side tied to a villager there named Christian Gutknecht centuries ago.

== History ==
Ried bei Kerzers is first mentioned in 1340 as Riedes. Until 1901 it was known as Oberried.

== Geography ==
Ried bei Kerzers has an area of 7.55 km^{2} (2.92 sq mi). Of this area, 6.09 km^{2} (2.35 mi^{2}) or 80.2% is used for agricultural purposes, while 0.54 km^{2} (0.21 mi^{2}) or 7.1% is forested. Of the rest of the land, 0.9 km^{2} (0.35 mi^{2}) or 11.9% is settled (buildings or roads), 0.01 km^{2} (2.5 acres) or 0.1% is either rivers or lakes and 0.03 km^{2} (7.4 acres) or 0.4% is unproductive land.

Of the built up area, industrial buildings made up 1.1% of the total area while housing and buildings made up 4.5% and transportation infrastructure made up 6.2%. Out of the forested land, all of the forested land area is covered with heavy forests. Of the agricultural land, 67.1% is used for growing crops and 9.4% is pastures, while 3.8% is used for orchards or vine crops. All the water in the municipality is flowing water.

The municipality is located in the See/Lac district, near the Grosses Moos wetlands. It consists of the linear village of Ried bei Kerzers, the hamlet of Gurzelen, part of the Grosses Moos, and since 2006 the former municipality of Agriswil.

Aerial view (1954)

== Coat of arms ==
The blazon of the municipal coat of arms is Argent a House of the same roofed Gules behind a Beech Vert all issuant from a Base of the last.

== Demographics ==
Ried bei Kerzers has a population (as of December 2020) of 1,229. As of 2008, 14.5% of the population are resident foreign nationals. Over the last 10 years (2000–2010) the population has changed at a rate of 14.6%. Migration accounted for 11.3%, while births and deaths accounted for 3.4%.

Most of the population (as of 2000) speaks German (633 or 91.1%) as their first language, Portuguese is the second most common (25 or 3.6%) and French is the third (22 or 3.2%). There are 4 people who speak Italian.

As of 2008, the population was made up of 817 Swiss citizens and 139 non-citizen residents (14.54% of the population). Of the population in the municipality, 266 or about 38.3% were born in Ried bei Kerzers and lived there in 2000. There were 91 or 13.1% who were born in the same canton, while 253 or 36.4% were born somewhere else in Switzerland, and 73 or 10.5% were born outside of Switzerland.

As of 2000, children and teenagers (0–19 years old) make up 25.2% of the population, while adults (20–64 years old) make up 62.5% and seniors (over 64 years old) make up 12.4%.

As of 2000, there were 291 people who were single and never married in the municipality. There were 336 married individuals, 38 widows or widowers and 30 individuals who are divorced.

As of 2000, there were 310 private households in the municipality, and an average of 2.6 persons per household. There were 59 households that consist of only one person and 14 households with five or more people. In 2000, a total of 252 apartments (93.0% of the total) were permanently occupied, while 6 apartments (2.2%) were seasonally occupied and 13 apartments (4.8%) were empty. As of 2009, the construction rate of new housing units was 3.1 new units per 1000 residents. The vacancy rate for the municipality, in 2010, was 0.51%.

The historical population is given in the following chart:

== Politics ==
In the 2011 federal election the most popular party was the SVP which received 30.4% of the vote. The next three most popular parties were the FDP (27.1%), the SPS (10.2%) and the CVP (7.8%).

The SVP lost about 11.9% of the vote when compared to the 2007 Federal election (42.3% in 2007 vs 30.4% in 2011). The FDP retained about the same popularity (31.5% in 2007), the SPS retained about the same popularity (8.3% in 2007) and the CVP retained about the same popularity (7.5% in 2007). A total of 367 votes were cast in this election, of which 2 or 0.5% were invalid.

== Economy ==
As of 2010, Ried bei Kerzers had an unemployment rate of 0.7%. As of 2008, there were 216 people employed in the primary economic sector and about 38 businesses involved in this sector. 127 people were employed in the secondary sector and there were 14 businesses in this sector. 175 people were employed in the tertiary sector, with 26 businesses in this sector. There were 411 residents of the municipality who were employed in some capacity, of which females made up 41.4% of the workforce.

In 2008 the total number of full-time equivalent jobs was 439. The number of jobs in the primary sector was 181, all of which were in agriculture. The number of jobs in the secondary sector was 121 of which 45 or (37.2%) were in manufacturing and 76 (62.8%) were in construction. The number of jobs in the tertiary sector was 137. In the tertiary sector; 109 or 79.6% were in wholesale or retail sales or the repair of motor vehicles, 6 or 4.4% were in the movement and storage of goods, 5 or 3.6% were in a hotel or restaurant, 2 or 1.5% were in the information industry, 1 was the insurance or financial industry, 3 or 2.2% were in education and 6 or 4.4% were in health care.

In 2000, there were 161 workers who commuted into the municipality and 231 workers who commuted away. The municipality is a net exporter of workers, with about 1.4 workers leaving the municipality for every one entering. Of the working population, 13.4% used public transportation to get to work, and 50.2% used a private car.

== Religion ==
From the 2000 census, 114 or 16.4% were Roman Catholic, while 522 or 75.1% belonged to the Swiss Reformed Church. Of the rest of the population, there were 26 individuals (or about 3.74% of the population) who belonged to another Christian church. There were 9 (or about 1.29% of the population) who were Islamic. There was 1 person who was Buddhist and 1 individual who belonged to another church. 31 (or about 4.46% of the population) belonged to no church, are agnostic or atheist, and 4 individuals (or about 0.58% of the population) did not answer the question.

== Education ==
In Ried bei Kerzers about 273 or (39.3%) of the population have completed non-mandatory upper secondary education, and 82 or (11.8%) have completed additional higher education (either university or a Fachhochschule). Of the 82 who completed tertiary schooling, 74.4% were Swiss men, 20.7% were Swiss women.

The Canton of Fribourg school system provides one year of non-obligatory Kindergarten, followed by six years of Primary school. This is followed by three years of obligatory lower Secondary school where the students are separated according to ability and aptitude. Following the lower Secondary students may attend a three or four year optional upper Secondary school. The upper Secondary school is divided into gymnasium (university preparatory) and vocational programs. After they finish the upper Secondary program, students may choose to attend a Tertiary school or continue their apprenticeship.

During the 2010-11 school year, there were a total of 88 students attending 4 classes in Ried bei Kerzers. A total of 155 students from the municipality attended any school, either in the municipality or outside of it. There were 2 kindergarten classes with a total of 40 students in the municipality. The municipality had 2 primary classes and 48 students. During the same year, there were no lower secondary classes in the municipality, but 29 students attended lower secondary school in a neighboring municipality. There were no upper Secondary classes or vocational classes, but there were 13 upper Secondary students and 8 upper Secondary vocational students who attended classes in another municipality. The municipality had no non-university Tertiary classes, but there were 2 specialized Tertiary students who attended classes in another municipality.

As of 2000, there were 41 students in Ried bei Kerzers who came from another municipality, while 55 residents attended schools outside the municipality.
