= List of mayors of Murten =

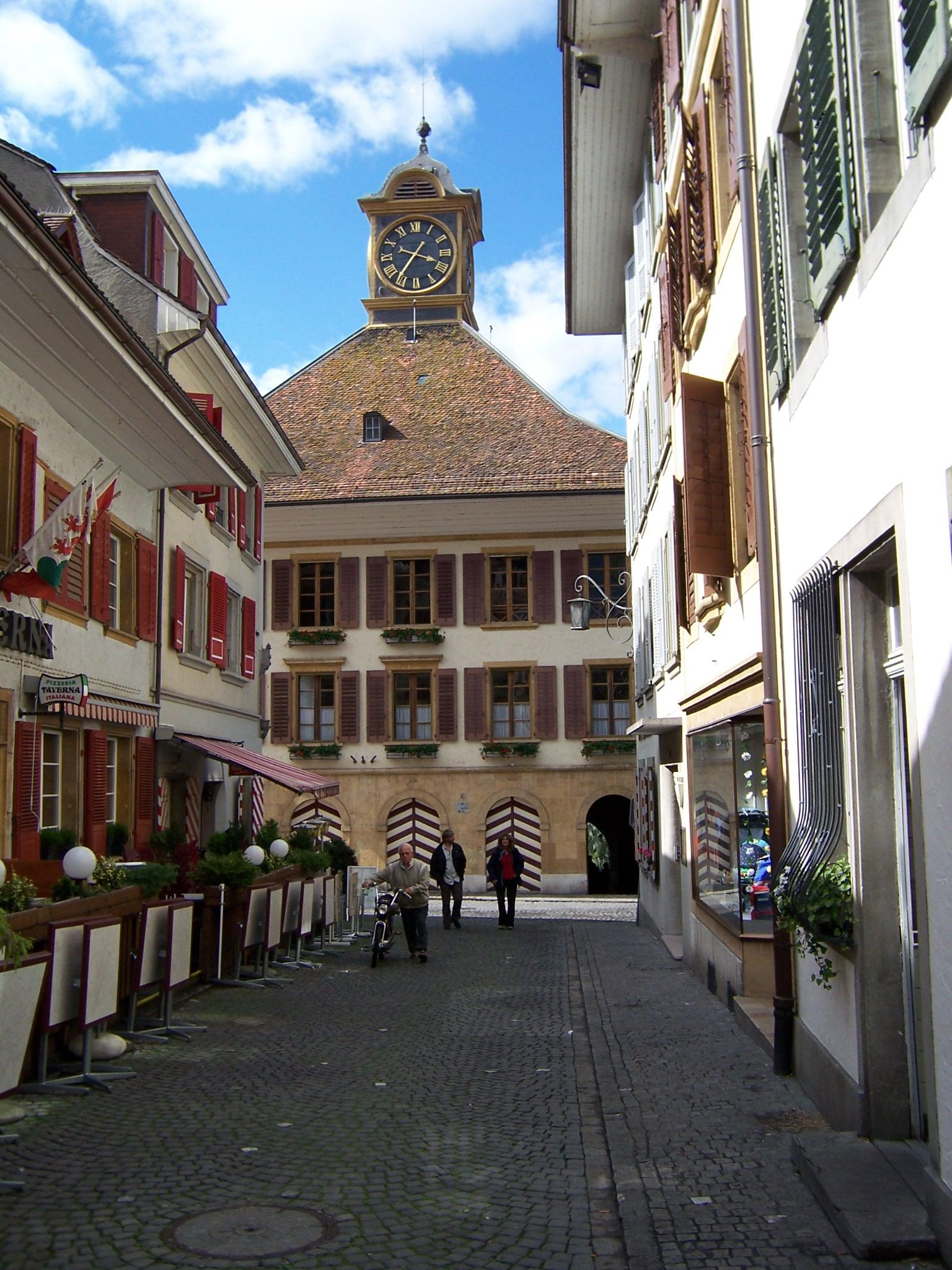
Rathaus Murten

Coat of arms of Murten/Morat

This is a list of mayors of Murten (Stadtammann von Murten, Syndic de Morat), Canton of Fribourg, Switzerland.

Mayor (Stadtammann/Syndic) of Murten/Morat
| Term | Mayor | Lifespan | Party | Notes |
|---|---|---|---|---|
| 1848–1861 (1st) | Eduard Huber | (1818–1893) | | |
| 1879–1893 (2nd) | Eduard Huber | (1818–1893) | | |
| | Max Friolet | (1878–1943) | | |
| -1972 | Fernand Simon | | | |
| 1972–1987 | Albert Engel (mayor) | (-2001) | | |
| 1995–2011 | Christiane Feldmann | | | |
| 2011–present | Christian Brechbühl | | FDP/PRD | |
