= Gaston Mullegg =

Swiss sports official

Gaston Mullegg (24 August 1890 – 3 August 1958), also known as Mühlegg, was a Swiss sports official. He was the president of the Fédération Internationale des Sociétés d'Aviron (FISA), the International Rowing Federation, from 1949 or 1950 (sources differ) until his death.

Mullegg was born in 1890 in Murten, Switzerland. He had an interest for many sports but his passion was for rowing. As a rowing official, he was involved in organising the Olympic rowing competitions in Amsterdam (1928), Los Angeles (1932), Berlin (1936), London (1948), Helsinki (1952), and Melbourne (1956). He became president of FISA when he succeeded Rico Fioroni in 1949 or 1950.

Aged 64, Mullegg obtained a pilot's license. He was piloting a plane near the Parc de Mon Repos in Lausanne when the engine lost power. Mullegg was killed in the crash and his two passengers, French rowers Jean Méry and Louis Patricot, suffered serious injuries. He was survived by his wife and succeeded by Thomas Keller as president of FISA.

Mullegg is credited with conceiving the idea of having World Rowing Championships. The first world championships had been planned for 1958 in Philadelphia but at the FISA congress in 1957, the Americans withdrew from organising the event. Work on contingency plans stopped when Mullegg died. At the FISA congress in November 1958, it was agreed that world championships would proceed and the inaugural World Rowing Championships were held in 1962 in Lucerne.
