= Galmiz =

- Former municipality
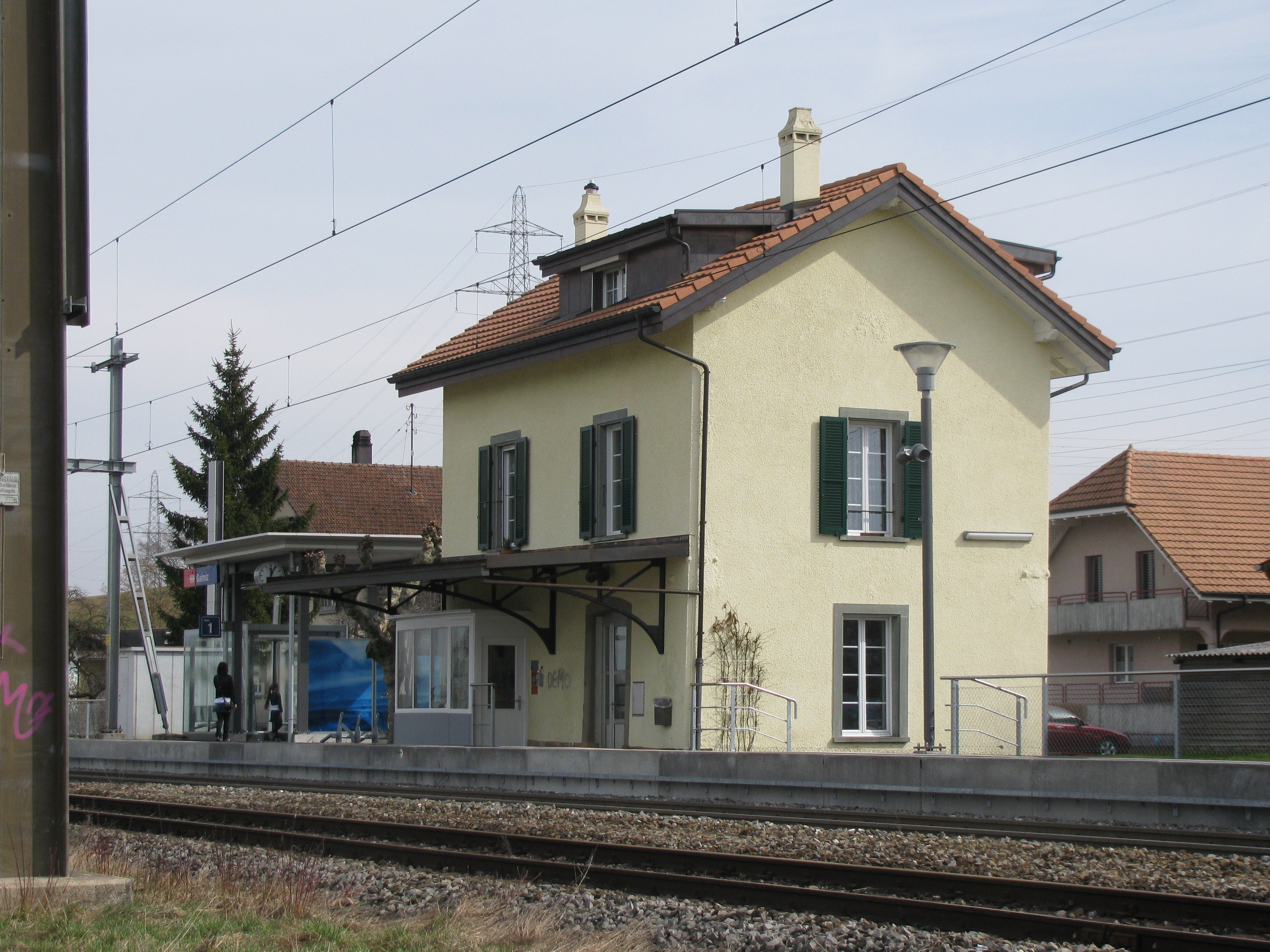
- Galmiz train station

- Coat of arms
- Location of Galmiz
- Location within Switzerland Location within Canton of Fribourg
- Coordinates: 46°57′N 7°9′E
- Country: Switzerland
- Canton: Fribourg
- District: See

Government
  - Executive: Gemeinderat with 5 members
  - Mayor: Ammann

Area
  - Total: 8.92 km^{2} (3.44 sq mi)
- Elevation: 441 m (1,447 ft)

Population (December 2020)
  - Total: 749
  - Density: 84.0/km^{2} (217/sq mi)
- Time zone: UTC+01:00 (CET)
  - Summer (DST): UTC+02:00 (CEST)
- Postal code: 3285
- SFOS number: 2259
- ISO 3166 code: CH-FR
- Surrounded by: Bas-Vully, Büchslen, Muntelier, Murten/Morat, Ried bei Kerzers
- Website: www.galmiz.ch

Galmiz (former French name: Charmey) is a former municipality in the district of See in the canton of Fribourg in Switzerland. On 1 January 2022 the former municipalities of Galmiz, Gempenach and Clavaleyres (Canton of Bern) merged into the municipality of Murten.

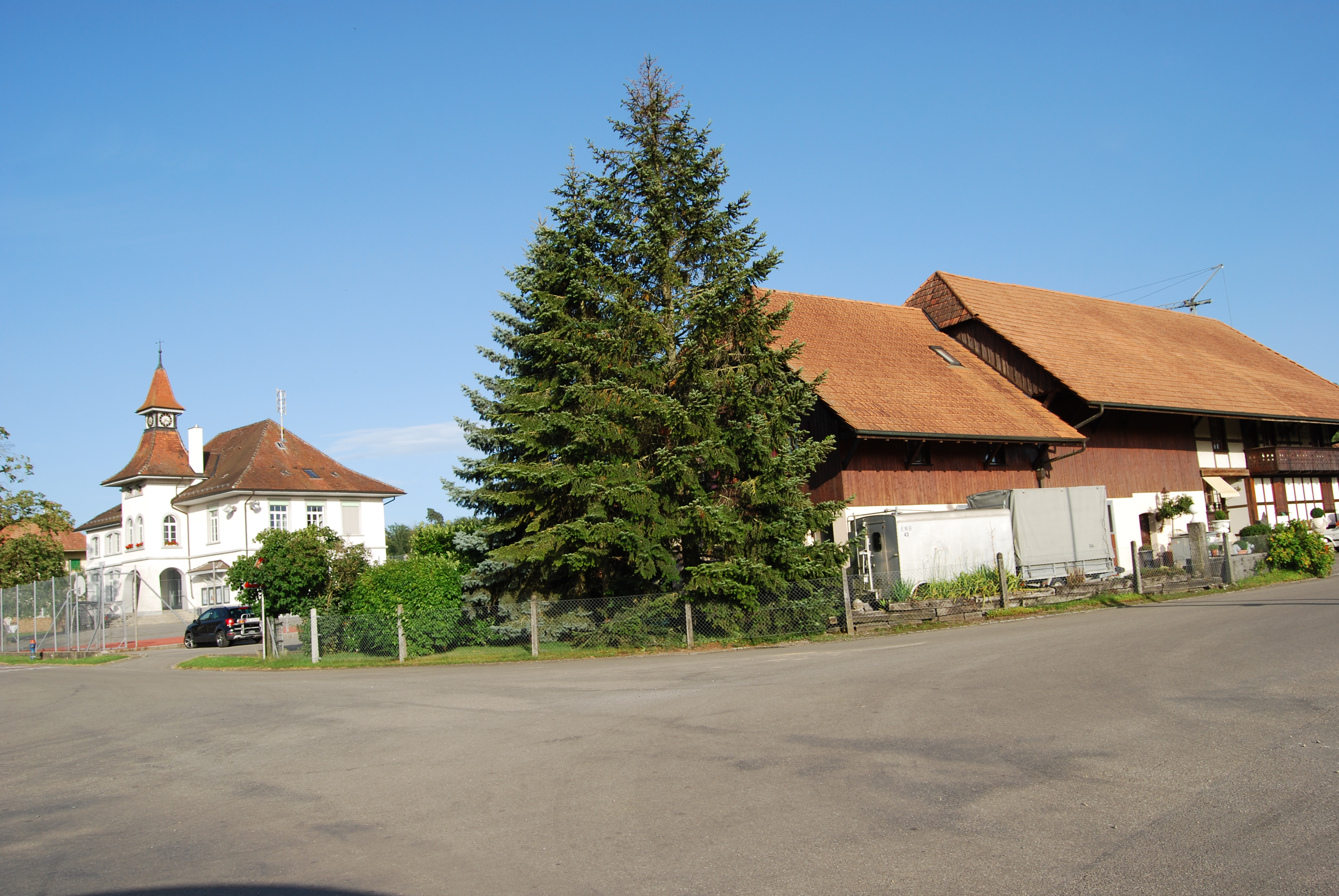
Galmiz

== History ==
Galmiz is first mentioned in 1242 as Chalmitis. In 1340 it was mentioned as Charmey.

== Geography ==
Galmiz has an area, as of 2009, of 9.1 square kilometers (3.5 mi^{2}). Of this area, 6.39 km^{2} (2.47 mi^{2}) or 70.5% is used for agricultural purposes, while 1.69 km^{2} (0.65 mi^{2}) or 18.7% is forested. Of the rest of the land, 0.71 km^{2} (0.27 mi^{2}) or 7.8% is settled (buildings or roads), 0.07 km^{2} (17 acres) or 0.8% is either rivers or lakes and 0.19 km^{2} (0.073 mi^{2}) or 2.1% is unproductive land.

Of the built up area, housing and buildings made up 2.4% and transportation infrastructure made up 4.6%. Out of the forested land, all of the forested land area is covered with heavy forests. Of the agricultural land, 66.2% is used for growing crops and 3.8% is pastures. All the water in the municipality is flowing water.

The municipality is located in the See/Lac district, on the edge of the Grosses Moos wetlands and about 4 km (2.5 mi) north-east of Murten. It consists of the linear village of Galmiz.

== Coat of arms ==
The blazon of the municipal coat of arms is Gules a Wheel Or.

== Demographics ==
Galmiz has a population (as of December 2020) of 749. As of 2008, 13.7% of the population are resident foreign nationals. Over the last 10 years (2000–2010) the population has changed at a rate of 9.7%. Migration accounted for 3.6%, while births and deaths accounted for 3.2%.

It is a majority German speaking municipality in the mostly French speaking Canton of Fribourg. Most of the population (as of 2000) speaks German (504 or 90.0%) as their first language, French is the second most common (30 or 5.4%) and Italian is the third (7 or 1.3%).

As of 2008, the population was 52.8% male and 47.2% female. The population was made up of 263 Swiss men (43.1% of the population) and 59 (9.7%) non-Swiss men. There were 249 Swiss women (40.8%) and 39 (6.4%) non-Swiss women. Of the population in the municipality, 181 or about 32.3% were born in Galmiz and lived there in 2000. There were 121 or 21.6% who were born in the same canton, while 186 or 33.2% were born somewhere else in Switzerland, and 45 or 8.0% were born outside of Switzerland.

As of 2000, children and teenagers (0–19 years old) make up 23.4% of the population, while adults (20–64 years old) make up 63.6% and seniors (over 64 years old) make up 13%.

As of 2000, there were 229 people who were single and never married in the municipality. There were 276 married individuals, 37 widows or widowers and 18 individuals who are divorced.

As of 2000, there were 231 private households in the municipality, and an average of 2.4 persons per household. There were 70 households that consist of only one person and 18 households with five or more people. In 2000, a total of 224 apartments (91.4% of the total) were permanently occupied, while 16 apartments (6.5%) were seasonally occupied and 5 apartments (2.0%) were empty. As of 2009, the construction rate of new housing units was 3.3 new units per 1000 residents.

The historical population is given in the following chart:

== Politics ==
In the 2011 federal election the most popular party was the SVP which received 35.7% of the vote. The next two most popular parties were the FDP (15.1%), and the SPS (11.7%) .

The SVP lost about 10.7% of the vote when compared to the 2007 Federal election (46.4% in 2007 vs 35.7% in 2011). The FDP retained about the same popularity (19.4% in 2007), the SPS retained about the same popularity (12.2% in 2007) and the BDP moved from below fourth place in 2007 to fourth. A total of 208 votes were cast in this election, of which 1 or 0.5% was invalid.

== Economy ==
As of 2010, Galmiz had an unemployment rate of 1.4%. As of 2008, there were 92 people employed in the primary economic sector and about 19 businesses involved in this sector. 18 people were employed in the secondary sector and there were 7 businesses in this sector. 57 people were employed in the tertiary sector, with 15 businesses in this sector. There were 324 residents of the municipality who were employed in some capacity, of which females made up 42.0% of the workforce.

In 2008 the total number of full-time equivalent jobs was 132. The number of jobs in the primary sector was 73, all of which were in agriculture. The number of jobs in the secondary sector was 16 of which 7 or (43.8%) were in manufacturing and 7 (43.8%) were in construction. The number of jobs in the tertiary sector was 43. In the tertiary sector; 19 or 44.2% were in wholesale or retail sales or the repair of motor vehicles, 1 was in the movement and storage of goods, 2 or 4.7% were in a hotel or restaurant, 3 or 7.0% were technical professionals or scientists, 3 or 7.0% were in education and 9 or 20.9% were in health care.

In 2000, there were 113 workers who commuted into the municipality and 226 workers who commuted away. The municipality is a net exporter of workers, with about 2.0 workers leaving the municipality for every one entering. Of the working population, 13% used public transportation to get to work, and 57.4% used a private car.

== Religion ==
From the 2000 census, 99 or 17.7% were Roman Catholic, while 385 or 68.8% belonged to the Swiss Reformed Church. Of the rest of the population, there was 1 member of an Orthodox church, and there were 33 individuals (or about 5.89% of the population) who belonged to another Christian church. There were 4 (or about 0.71% of the population) who were Islamic. 33 (or about 5.89% of the population) belonged to no church, are agnostic or atheist, and 21 individuals (or about 3.75% of the population) did not answer the question.

== Education ==
In Galmiz about 211 or (37.7%) of the population have completed non-mandatory upper secondary education, and 71 or (12.7%) have completed additional higher education (either university or a Fachhochschule). Of the 71 who completed tertiary schooling, 70.4% were Swiss men, 19.7% were Swiss women, 8.5% were non-Swiss men.

The Canton of Fribourg school system provides one year of non-obligatory Kindergarten, followed by six years of Primary school. This is followed by three years of obligatory lower Secondary school where the students are separated according to ability and aptitude. Following the lower Secondary students may attend a three or four year optional upper Secondary school. The upper Secondary school is divided into gymnasium (university preparatory) and vocational programs. After they finish the upper Secondary program, students may choose to attend a Tertiary school or continue their apprenticeship.

During the 2010-11 school year, there were a total of 30 students attending 2 classes in Galmiz. A total of 95 students from the municipality attended any school, either in the municipality or outside of it. There was one kindergarten class with a total of 14 students in the municipality. The municipality had one primary class and 16 students. During the same year, there were no lower secondary classes in the municipality, but 22 students attended lower secondary school in a neighboring municipality. There were no upper Secondary classes or vocational classes, but there were 10 upper Secondary students and 10 upper Secondary vocational students who attended classes in another municipality. The municipality had no non-university Tertiary classes, but there was one specialized Tertiary student who attended classes in another municipality.

As of 2000, there were 2 students in Galmiz who came from another municipality, while 51 residents attended schools outside the municipality.

== Transportation ==
The municipality has a railway station, Galmiz, on the Palézieux–Lyss railway line. It has regular service to Lausanne, Bern, and Kerzers.
