= Meyriez =

- Municipality
- Coat of arms
- Location of Meyriez
- Location within Switzerland Location within Canton of Fribourg
- Coordinates: 46°55′N 7°7′E
- Country: Switzerland
- Canton: Fribourg
- District: See or du Lac

Government
  - Executive: Conseil communal/Gemeinderat with 5 members
  - Mayor: Syndic/Gemeindeammann

Area
  - Total: 0.32 km^{2} (0.12 sq mi)
- Elevation: 435 m (1,427 ft)

Population (December 2020)
  - Total: 590
  - Density: 1,800/km^{2} (4,800/sq mi)
- Time zone: UTC+01:00 (CET)
  - Summer (DST): UTC+02:00 (CEST)
- Postal code: 3280
- SFOS number: 2271
- ISO 3166 code: CH-FR
- Surrounded by: Greng, Haut-Vully, Murten/Morat
- Website: www.meyriez.ch

Meyriez (French: [mɛːʁije]; Arpitan: Mêriéz [mɛˈʁi]; German: Merlach) is a municipality in the district of See or du Lac in the canton of Fribourg in Switzerland. Since the 1980s it has been one of the municipalities with a large majority of German speakers in its predominantly French-speaking canton.

== History ==
Meyriez is first mentioned in 1162 as de Meriaco. In 1178 it was mentioned as Meriei.

== Geography ==
Meyriez has an area of 0.34 km^{2} (0.13 sq mi). Of this area, 0.01 km^{2} (0.0039 mi^{2}) or 2.9% is used for agricultural purposes, while 0 km^{2} (0 mi^{2}) or 0.0% is forested. Of the rest of the land, 0.3 km^{2} (0.12 mi^{2}) or 88.2% is settled (buildings or roads) and 0.02 km^{2} (4.9 acres) or 5.9% is unproductive land.

Of the urbanized area, industrial buildings made up 2.9% of the total area while housing and buildings made up 61.8% and transportation infrastructure made up 17.6%. while parks, green belts and sports fields made up 5.9%. Out of the forested land, all of the forested land area is covered with heavy forests. Of the agricultural land, 2.9% is used for growing crops.

The municipality is located in the See/Lac district. This former fishing village is now a commuter town and part of the agglomeration of Morat.

== Coat of arms ==
The blazon of the municipal coat of arms is Gules, two Fishes endorsed Argent.

== Demographics ==
Meyriez has a population (as of December 2020) of 590. As of 2008, 7.9% of the population are resident foreign nationals. Most of the population (as of 2000) speaks German (444 or 81.2%) as their first language, French is the second most common (74 or 13.5%) and Italian is the third (8 or 1.5%).

As of 2008, the population was 48.6% male and 51.4% female. The population was made up of 255 Swiss men (43.3% of the population) and 31 (5.3%) non-Swiss men. There were 279 Swiss women (47.4%) and 24 (4.1%) non-Swiss women. Of the population in the municipality, 76 or about 13.9% were born in Meyriez and lived there in 2000. There were 134 or 24.5% who were born in the same canton, while 235 or 43.0% were born somewhere else in Switzerland, and 90 or 16.5% were born outside of Switzerland.

As of 2000, children and teenagers (0–19 years old) make up 27.4% of the population, while adults (20–64 years old) make up 58.9% and seniors (over 64 years old) make up 13.7%.

As of 2000, there were 218 people who were single and never married in the municipality. There were 304 married individuals, 19 widows or widowers and 6 individuals who are divorced.

As of 2000, there were 211 private households in the municipality, and an average of 2.6 persons per household. There were 46 households that consist of only one person and 17 households with five or more people. In 2000, a total of 207 apartments (86.6% of the total) were permanently occupied, while 29 apartments (12.1%) were seasonally occupied and 3 apartments (1.3%) were empty. As of 2009, the construction rate of new housing units was 6.7 new units per 1000 residents.

The historical population is given in the following chart:

== Politics ==
In the 2011 federal election the most popular party was the FDP which received 23.2% of the vote. The next three most popular parties were the SVP (22.7%), the SPS (20.3%) and the Green Liberal Party (10.4%).

The FDP improved their position in Meyriez rising to first, from second in 2007 (with 24.9%) The SVP moved from first in 2007 (with 25.3%) to second in 2011, the SPS retained about the same popularity (21.5% in 2007) and the Grünliberale moved from below fourth place in 2007 to fourth. A total of 271 votes were cast in this election, of which 15 or 5.5% were invalid.

== Economy ==
As of 2010, Meyriez had an unemployment rate of 0.3%. As of 2008, there were people employed in the primary economic sector and about businesses involved in this sector. No one was employed in the secondary sector. 269 people were employed in the tertiary sector, with 18 businesses in this sector. There were 266 residents of the municipality who were employed in some capacity, of which females made up 41.7% of the workforce.

In 2008 the total number of full-time equivalent jobs was 218. There were no jobs in the primary or secondary sectors. The number of jobs in the tertiary sector was 218. In the tertiary sector; 8 or 3.7% were in wholesale or retail sales or the repair of motor vehicles, 68 or 31.2% were in a hotel or restaurant, 2 or 0.9% were in the information industry, 9 or 4.1% were technical professionals or scientists, and 126 or 57.8% were in health care.

In 2000, there were 209 workers who commuted into the municipality and 225 workers who commuted away. The municipality is a net exporter of workers, with about 1.1 workers leaving the municipality for every one entering. Of the working population, 15.4% used public transportation to get to work, and 56.8% used a private car.

== Religion ==
From the 2000 census, 142 or 26.0% were Roman Catholic, while 326 or 59.6% belonged to the Swiss Reformed Church. Of the rest of the population, there were 2 members of an Orthodox church (or about 0.37% of the population), and there were 14 individuals (or about 2.56% of the population) who belonged to another Christian church. There were 9 (or about 1.65% of the population) who were Islamic. 46 (or about 8.41% of the population) belonged to no church, are agnostic or atheist, and 15 individuals (or about 2.74% of the population) did not answer the question.

== Education ==
In Meyriez about 224 or (41.0%) of the population have completed non-mandatory upper secondary education, and 95 or (17.4%) have completed additional higher education (either university or a Fachhochschule). Of the 95 who completed tertiary schooling, 67.4% were Swiss men, 20.0% were Swiss women, 10.5% were non-Swiss men.

The Canton of Fribourg school system provides one year of non-obligatory Kindergarten, followed by six years of Primary school. This is followed by three years of obligatory lower Secondary school where the students are separated according to ability and aptitude. Following the lower Secondary students may attend a three or four year optional upper Secondary school. The upper Secondary school is divided into gymnasium (university preparatory) and vocational programs. After they finish the upper Secondary program, students may choose to attend a Tertiary school or continue their apprenticeship.

During the 2010-11 school year, there were no students attending school in Meyriez, but a total of 112 students attended school in other municipalities. Of these students, 6 were in kindergarten, 43 were in a primary school, 33 were in a mandatory secondary school, 22 were in an upper secondary school and 8 were in a vocational secondary program. There were no tertiary students from this municipality.

As of 2000, there were 9 students in Meyriez who came from another municipality, while 95 residents attended schools outside the municipality.
