= Löwenberg Castle =

Castle in Fribourg, Switzerland

- Château de la Motte
- Murten
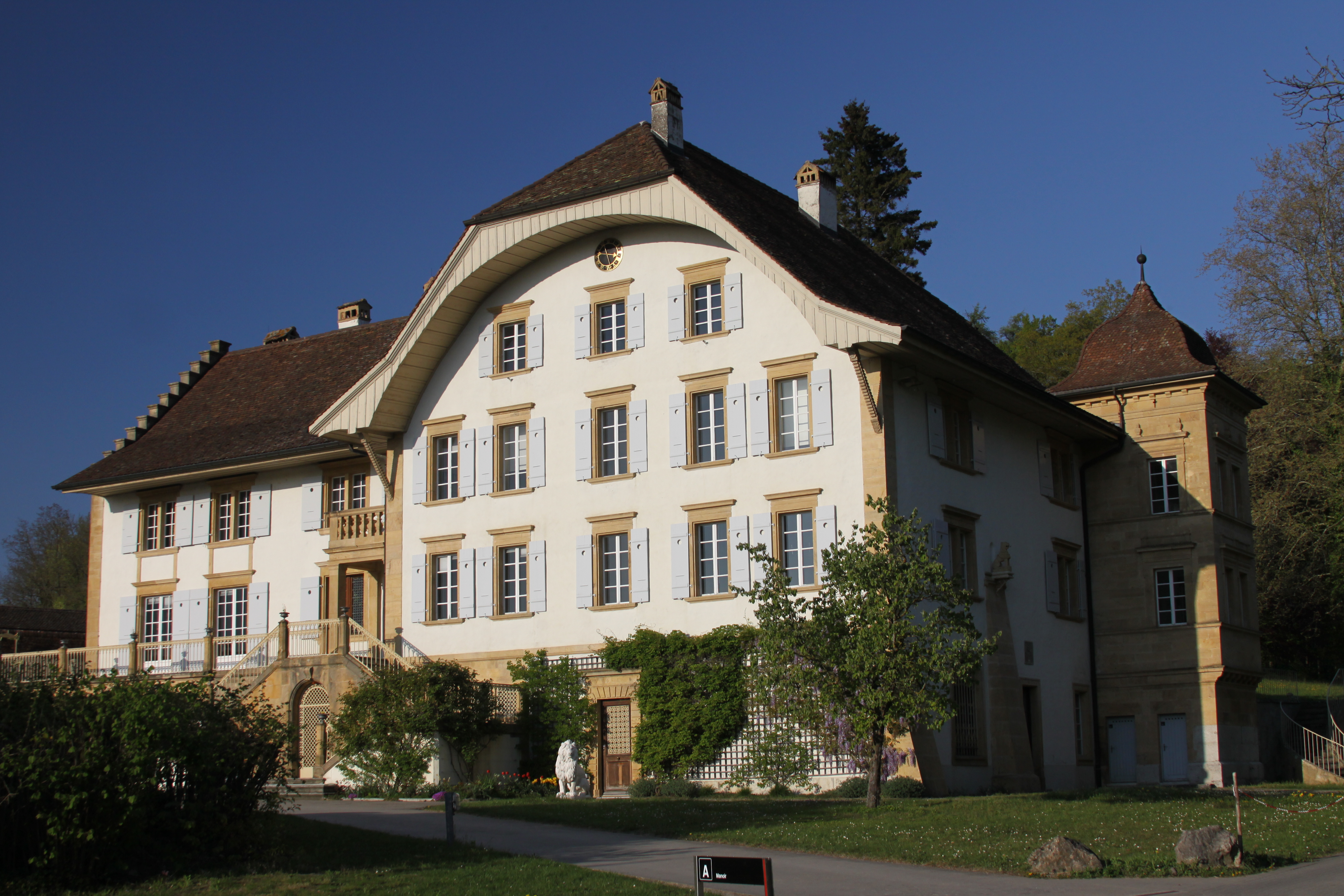
- Löwenberg Castle

Site information
- Type: Manor house
- Code: CH-FR
- Condition: Partly used as classrooms for the SBB-CFF-FFS

Location
- Coordinates: 46°56′20″N 7°08′16″E

Site history
- Built: 15th century

Löwenberg Castle or Château de la Motte is a castle in the municipality of Murten/Morat, in the Swiss canton of Fribourg. It is classified as a heritage site of national significance.

== See also ==
- List of castles in Switzerland
- Château
