= Agriswil =

Former municipality, canton of Fribourg

- Former municipality
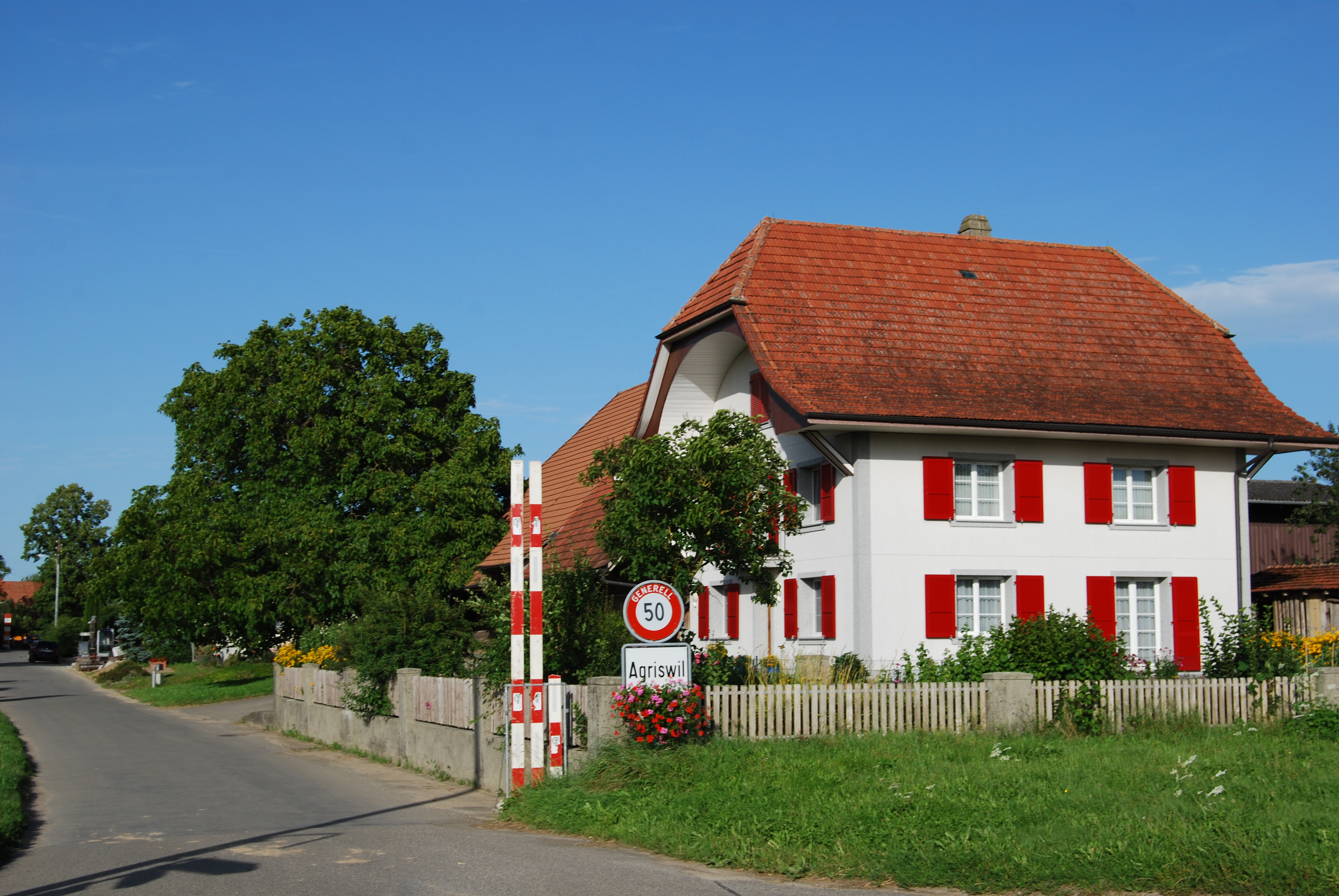
- Location of Agriswil
- Location within Switzerland Location within Canton of Fribourg
- Coordinates: 46.9542°N 7.1963°E
- Country: Switzerland
- Canton: Fribourg
- District: See
- Municipality: Ried bei Kerzers

Population (2000)
  - Total: 136
- Time zone: UTC+01:00 (CET)
  - Summer (DST): UTC+02:00 (CEST)
- ISO 3166 code: CH-FR
- Website

Agriswil (French: Agrimoine) is a former municipality in the See district of the canton of Fribourg, Switzerland. Since 2006 it has been part of the municipality of Ried bei Kerzers. The village lies 2 km west of the Ferenbalm stop on the Bern–Neuchâtel line.

== History ==
Agriswil is first mentioned in 1275 as Agerswyle, in 1340 as Grivilliar and in 1395 as Grevillard; the French name Agrimoine has been used only since the 16th century.

In the Middle Ages (attested from 1275) Agriswil belonged to the Cluniac priory of Münchenwiler, which passed to the chapter of St. Vincent (St. Vinzenzstift) in Bern in 1489 and was secularized in 1530. From 1475 Agriswil was part of the common lordship (gemeine Herrschaft) of Murten, held jointly by Bern and Fribourg. At the time of the Reformation the village adopted the new faith, and it remained part of the Bernese parish of Ferenbalm. In 1831 Agriswil became an independent municipality.

After the opening of the A1 motorway, Agriswil changed from a farming community into a residential one. Between 1970 and 1990 the share of residents commuting to work elsewhere rose from 8% to 73%.

Agriswil had 204 inhabitants in 1818, 170 in 1831, 194 in 1850, 167 in 1900, 125 in 1950, 89 in 1980 and 136 in 2000. In 2006 it became part of Ried bei Kerzers.

== Bibliography ==
- B. Roth, "Die romanisch-deutsche Sprachgrenze im Murtenbiet während des 15. Jahrhunderts", in Freiburger Geschichtsblätter 53, 1965, pp. 63–71
- H. Schwab, "Waren Murtenbiet und Seeland im frühen Mittelalter Grenzland – Niemandsland – Ödland?", in Freiburger Geschichtsblätter 57, 1971, pp. 21–73
- Hermann Schöpfer, Der Seebezirk II, 2000, pp. 295–296 (Die Kunstdenkmäler des Kantons Freiburg, 5)
