= Lake Morat =

Lake located in the cantons of Fribourg and Vaud in the west of Switzerland

- Lake Murten; Lac de Morat (French); Murtensee (German)
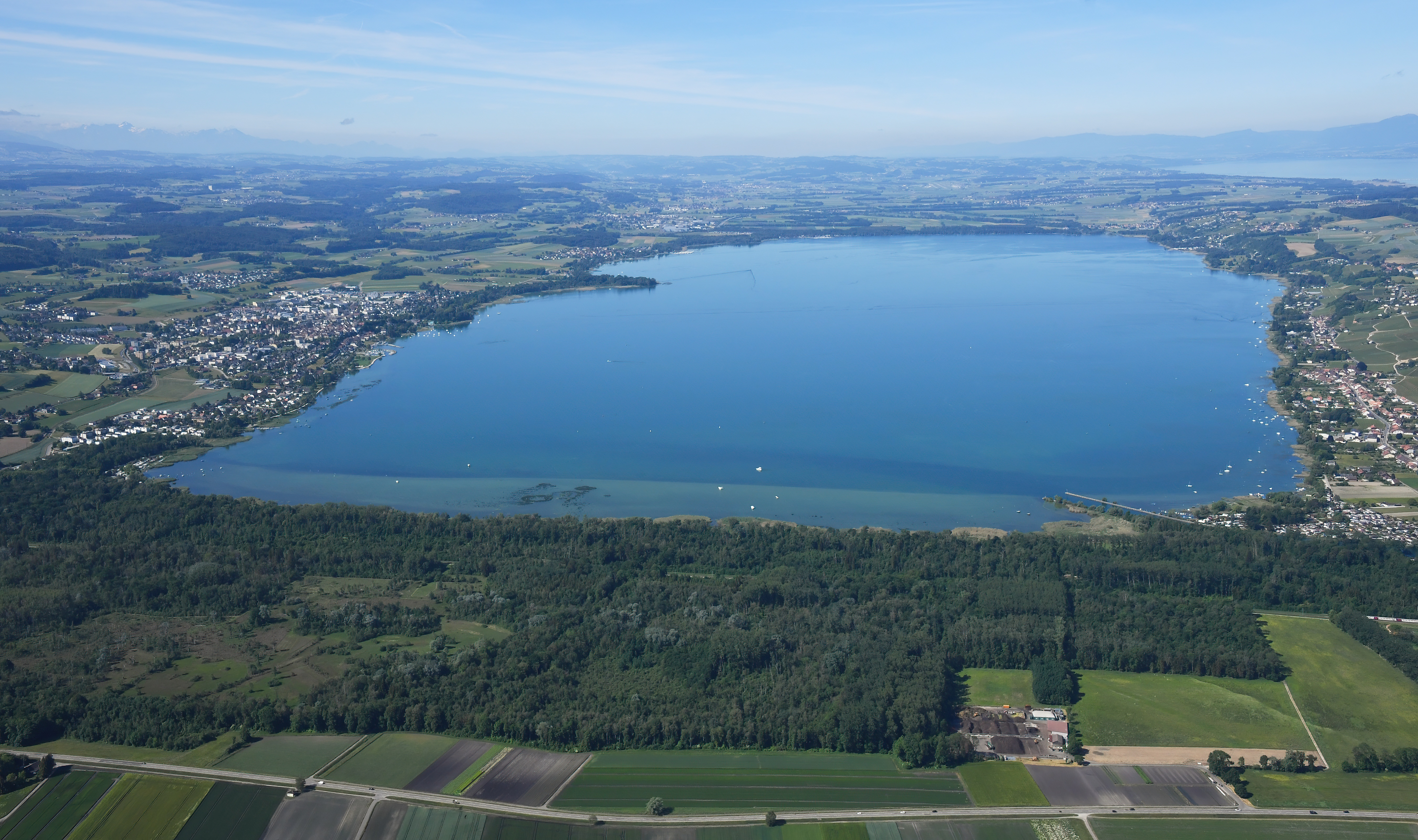

- Location within Canton of Fribourg Location within Switzerland Location within Alps
- Interactive map of Lake Morat
- Location: Cantons of Fribourg and Vaud
- Coordinates: 46°56′N 7°5′E
- Primary inflows: Broye
- Primary outflows: Broye canal
- Catchment area: 693 km^{2} (268 sq mi)
- Basin countries: Switzerland
- Max. length: 8.2 km (5.1 mi)
- Max. width: 2.8 km (1.7 mi)
- Surface area: 22.8 km^{2} (8.8 sq mi)
- Max. depth: 45 m (148 ft)
- Water volume: 0.55 km^{3} (450,000 acre⋅ft)
- Residence time: 1.6 years
- Surface elevation: 429 m (1,407 ft)
- Islands: La Grande Ile (islet)
- Settlements: Morat / Murten

Lake Morat or more rarely Lake Murten (French: Lac de Morat [lak də mɔʁa]) is a lake located in the cantons of Fribourg and Vaud in the west of Switzerland. It is named after the small bilingual town of Murten/Morat on its southern shore.

It is the smallest of the three lakes in the Seeland or Pays des trois lacs area of the Swiss Plateau located at the foot of the first chain of the Jura Mountains. The main tributary is the river Broye.

Since the Jura water correction its water leaves the lake through the Broye Canal (Canal de la Broye) into nearby Lake Neuchâtel that is connected to Lake Bienne/Lake Biel through the Thielle canal. Thus all three lakes form a natural reservoir in order to retain overflow water from the river Aare that flows into Lake Bienne/Biel: in times of combined heavy rainfalls and glacier melting in the Alps, the peculiar situation arises that the water flows backwards through the Thielle and Broye canals, preventing an overflow of the Grand Marais.

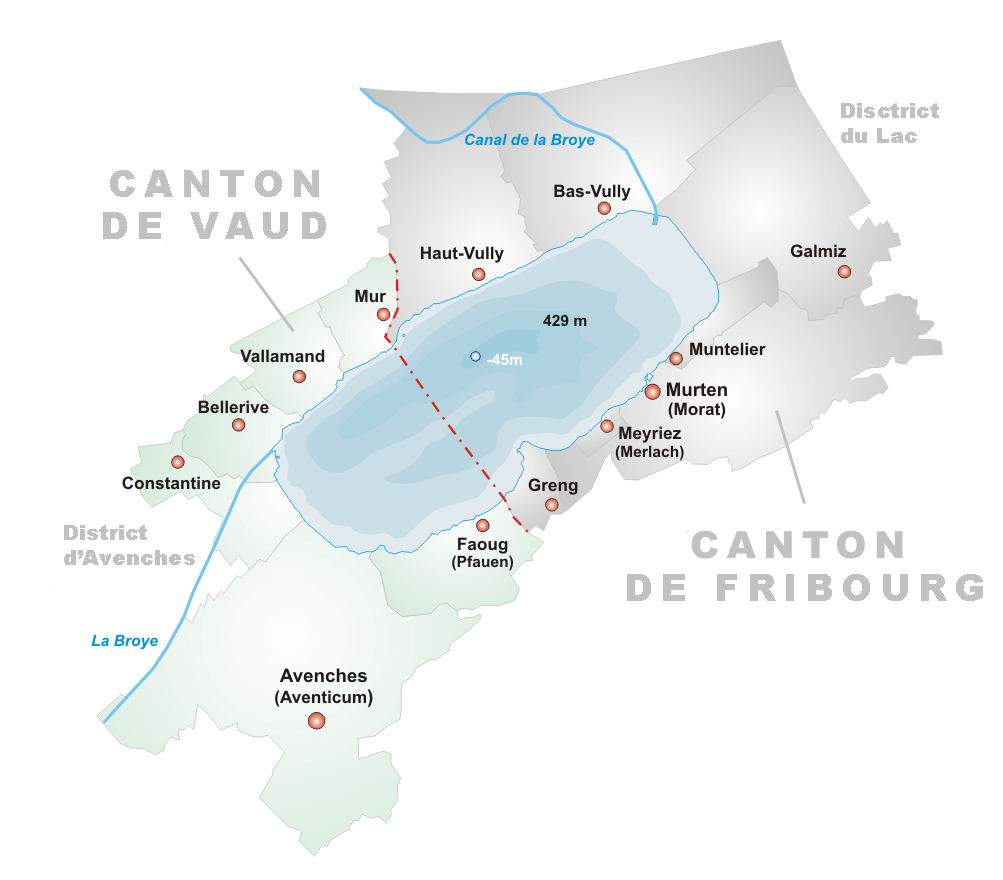
Lake Morat/Murten
