= Murten =

Murten/Morat
- Municipality
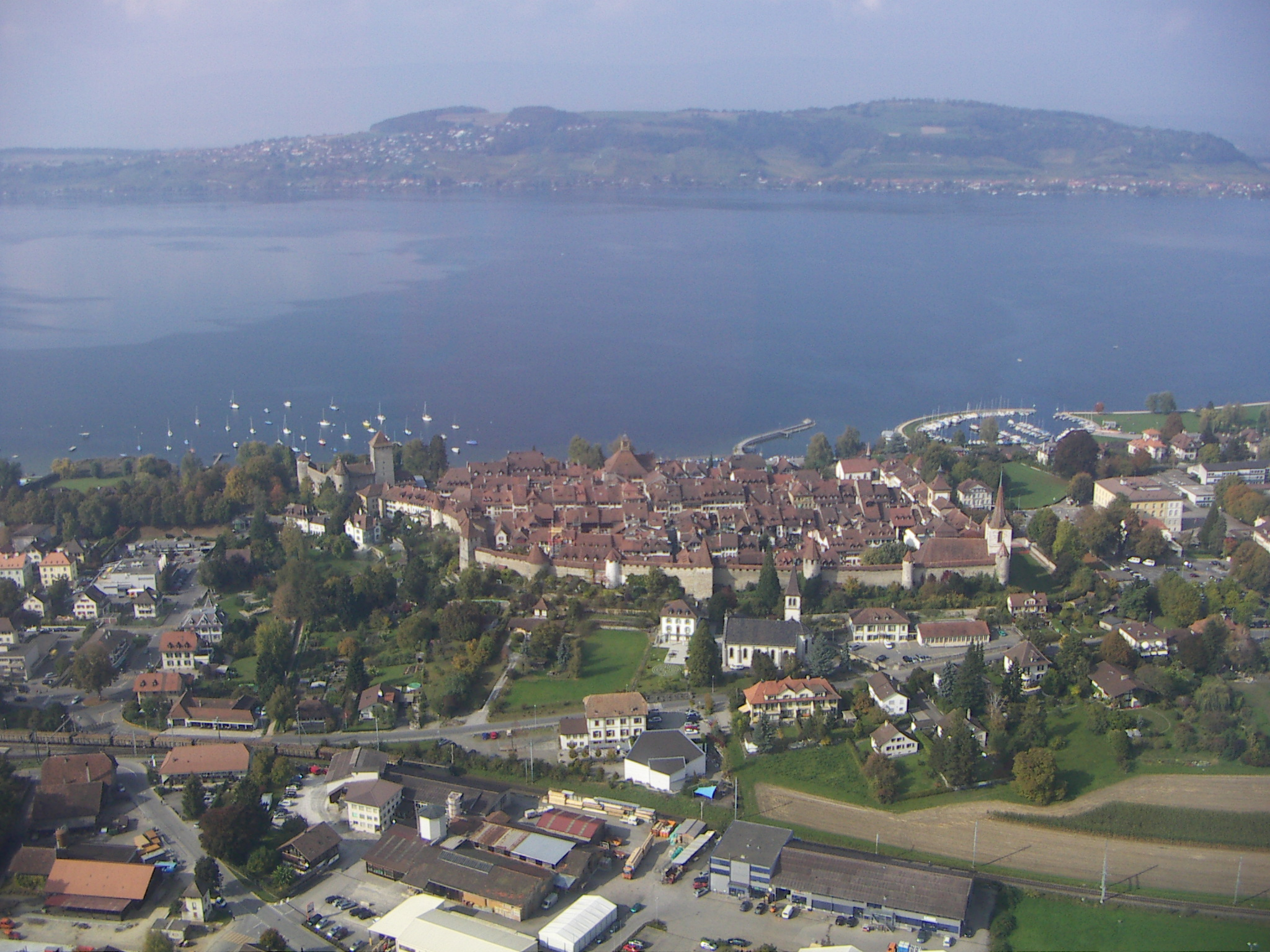

- Flag Coat of arms
- Location of Murten/Morat
- Location within Switzerland Location within Canton of Fribourg
- Coordinates: 46°55′N 7°07′E
- Country: Switzerland
- Canton: Fribourg
- District: See

Government
  - Executive: Gemeinderat / Conseil communal with 8 members
  - Mayor: Stadtammann / Syndic (list); Christian Brechbühl FDP/PRD (as of March 2014)
  - Parliament: Generalrat / Conseil général with 50 members

Area
  - Total: 12.02 km^{2} (4.64 sq mi)
- Elevation: 453 m (1,486 ft)

Population (December 2020)
  - Total: 8,244
  - Density: 685.9/km^{2} (1,776/sq mi)
- Time zone: UTC+01:00 (CET)
  - Summer (DST): UTC+02:00 (CEST)
- Postal code: 3280
- SFOS number: 2275
- ISO 3166 code: CH-FR
- Surrounded by: Bas-Vully, Büchslen, Courgevaux, Galmiz, Greng, Haut-Vully, Lurtigen (Lourtens), Meyriez, Münchenwiler (Villars-Les-Moines) (BE), Muntelier, Müntschemier (BE), Ried bei Kerzers, Salvenach (Saalvagny)
- Website: www.murten-morat.ch

Murten (German: [ˈmʊɐʔn̩]) or Morat (French: [mɔʁa]; Arpitan: Morât [mɔˈʁa]) is a German-language municipality and a city with a sizeable French-speaking minority in the See district of the canton of Fribourg in Switzerland.

It is located on the southern shores of Lake Murten (also known as Lake Morat). Murten is situated between Neuchâtel and Fribourg and is the capital of the See/Lac District of the canton of Fribourg. It is one of the municipalities with a majority (about 75%) of German speakers in the predominantly French-speaking Canton of Fribourg.

On 1 January 1975 the former municipality of Burg bei Murten merged into the municipality of Murten. It was followed on 1 January 1991 by the former municipality of Altavilla and on 1 January 2013 by the former municipality of Büchslen. On 1 January 2016 the former municipalities of Courlevon, Jeuss (Jentes), Lurtigen (Lourtens) and Salvenach (Salvagny) merged into Murten. On 1 January 2022 the former municipalities of Galmiz, Gempenach and Clavaleyres (Canton of Bern) merged into the municipality of Murten.

== History ==
The oldest archaeological traces of a settlement in the perimeter are from the Mesolithic (8200-5500 BC). The Mesolithic finds are mostly small flint shards for use in weapons or tools. These flints were produced mostly in the swampy lowlands east of the city at Murten-Combette and Murten-Ober Prehl. While many of these flint objects are in museums, the exact discovery sites were not properly documented and have been lost or covered by later excavations. Several other sites were discovered during construction of the A1 motorway in 1976–95. These settlements are from the Neolithic (5500-2500 BC) and the Bronze Age (2300-800 BC). Murten Pré de la Blanc was used in the Neolithic and middle Bronze Age, while the sites Murten-Lowenberg, Murten-Ober Prehl and Chantemerle 1 are from the Late Bronze Age. The cemetery at Lowenberg was used for more than a millennium, from the middle Bronze Age to the La Tène period. The nearby necropolis holds a number of Hallstatt era graves. The remains of a large Roman villa from the end of 1st or early 2nd century BC and a piece of a Roman road have also been found.

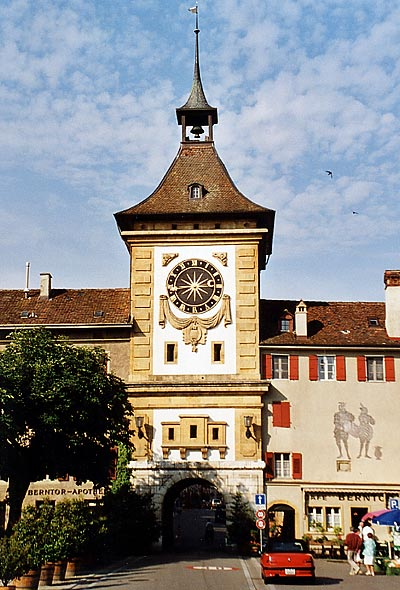
Berntor/Porte de Berne in Morat

The town's name derives from the Celtic word moriduno, meaning "lakeside fortress". It was first mentioned in 515 as a defensive place called "Muratum". In 1013, the area was fortified by King Rudolph III of Burgundy. The fortifications were attacked and occupied by Odo II of Blois-Champagne in 1032 during the conflict after Rudolph's death. Odo only held Murten briefly before Emperor Conrad II besieged and destroyed the castle. In 1079 Emperor Henry IV granted Muratum and other properties to the Bishop of Lausanne.

Murten was founded by Duke Berchtold IV of Zähringen or Landri de Durnes, the Bishop of Lausanne in either 1159 or during the 1170s or 1180s next to the fortress. Murten was first mentioned as a city in 1238. After his death the German emperor Frederic II recognized Murten as a "Free Imperial Town". At that time the emperor himself lived in the south of Italy and a small town north of the Alps was not his concern. It did not last long – in 1255 Murten fell under the protection of Count Peter of Savoy. When Philip I of Savoy refused to give Murten to him, King Rudolph of Habsburg seized it as a royal estate. After Rudolf's death Amadeus V of Savoy, bought the city again in 1291, but lost it to King Albert I of Germany again. The House of Savoy bought the city and surrounding lands again in 1310 for 4,000 marks of silver. This time the city remained under Savoy control. During this time, Murten began to develop alliances and ties with the surrounding Swiss cities. In 1245 they created a treaty with Fribourg, followed in 1335 with Bern.

A fire in 1416 led to rebuilding in stone.

The battle of Morat

On 22 June 1476, Charles the Bold, Duke of Burgundy, laid siege to the place in an action known as the Battle of Morat. The town hung on for 13 days but finally was saved by the Bernese army. The enemy's army was destroyed completely — some 10,000 Burgundians were killed. Since then, Murten celebrates the victory every year on June 22.

From 1484 on, and for 300 years, Murten was ruled by the two cantons — Bern and Fribourg. In 1530, under pressure from Bern, Murten adopted the Protestant Reformation, after the preacher Guillaume Farel began to preach the new faith. Murten's Protestant faith often brought the city into conflicts with the more conservative, Catholic Fribourg.

During the second half of the 17th century the city grew wealthy on trade over the road from Bern to Vaud and along the Broye river to Yverdon. Most of the houses in the city were rebuilt with this wealth. Although Bern and Fribourg had already granted Murten permission in 1584 to form guilds, the coopers, carpenters, locksmiths and cabinet makers first formed their guilds in 1731. In the late 17th century a brickyard and a brewery were built outside of town.

Following the 1798 French invasion, under the Helvetic Republic Murten was part of the Canton of Sarine and Broye. When the Republic collapsed, the Act of Mediation in 1803 gave the town to the canton of Fribourg.

Aerial photograph from 300 m by Walter Mittelholzer (1919)

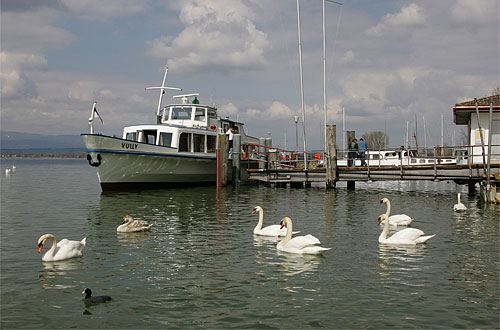
Morat harbor

Industrialization began in Murten in the early 1850s when Etienne-Ovide Domon founded a watch factory, which was later moved to Montelier. The Petitpierre family operated an absinthe distillery between 1831 and 1901 and Oskar Roggen ran a winery from 1888 to 1913. Since 1855 Murten has had its own newspaper, the "Murtenbieter", referring to the area around Murten. In the 20th century other industries settled in Murten; especially in the field of precision engineering, electronics and food. In 1973, the Swiss Federal Railways bought Löwenberg Castle and lands from the family de Rougemont, to establish a training center.

In 1856, a plan to run the Lausanne-Bern railway line through Murten was shelved and the line was rerouted through Fribourg. The loss of revenue from transportation affected Murten for almost twenty years. This changed in 1875–76 with the construction of the Palézieux-Murten-Lyss railway line. This first line was followed in 1898 with the Fribourg-Murten line and in 1903 with the Murten-Ins line, known collectively as the Fribourg–Ins railway. Steamship service between Murten and Neuchâtel began in 1835. The Bon Vouloir Hospital, opened in 1867 in Meyriez and by the 1920s it became the district hospital. The tourism industry, began with the celebration of the 400th anniversary of the Battle of Morat in 1876.

== Geography ==
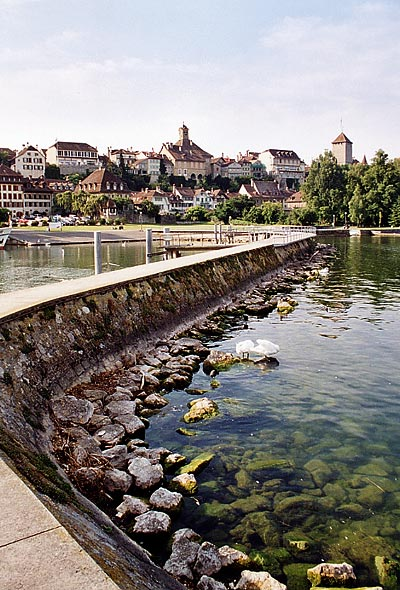
View across Murten harbour toward the old city on a hill above the lake

Murten has an area of 24.7 km^{2} (9.54 sq mi). Before the mergers expanded the municipal borders, 6.19 km^{2} (2.39 mi^{2}) or 51.4% was used for agricultural purposes, while 3.16 km^{2} (1.22 mi^{2}) or 26.2% were forested. Of the rest of the land, 2.6 km^{2} (1.0 mi^{2}) or 21.6% were settled (buildings or roads), 0.03 km^{2} (7.4 acres) or 0.2% were either rivers or lakes and 0.03 km^{2} (7.4 acres) or 0.2% was unproductive land.

Of the built up area, industrial buildings made up 1.6% of the total area while housing and buildings made up 9.4% and transportation infrastructure made up 9.1%. while parks, green belts and sports fields made up 1.2%. Out of the forested land, all of the forested land area is covered with heavy forests. Of the agricultural land, 40.4% is used for growing crops and 9.5% is pastures, while 1.4% is used for orchards or vine crops. All the water in the municipality is flowing water.

The small medieval town lies in the Swiss "Midlands" on the edge of the Great Marsh, on a gentle hill (450 m (1,480 ft) above sea level) and on the shore of Lake Murten. Numerous attractions from a significant past have been well preserved here, such as the castle, the ring wall, the street scene and the arcades. Lake Murten is a smaller lake located in between Lake Biel and the Lake Neuchâtel.

Mont Vully stands on the western side of the Seeland's largest plain and resembles a pearl gently placed among the three lakes of Murten, Neuchâtel and Biel/Bienne. Already long ago, the Celtic and Helvetic tribes appreciated the region's temperate climate and the local countryside's particular charm. Today, the Vully vineyards take up a large part of the south face of Mont Vully. The over 100 hectares of vineyards are facing towards Lake Murten.

== Coat of arms ==
The blazon of the municipal coat of arms is Argent a Lion rampant Gules crowned and armed Or on Coupeaux Vert.

== Demographics ==
In December 2020, Murten had a population of 8,244. In 2008 19.3% of the population consisted of resident foreign nationals. From 2000 to 2010 the population increased at a rate of 11%. Migration accounted for 9.1%, while births and deaths accounted for 2.5%.

In 2000, most of the population spoke German (4,269 or 76.5%) as its first language, French was the second most common (716 or 12.8%), and Italian third (108 or 1.9%). There were five residents who spoke Romansh.

In 2008 the population was 47.8% male and 52.2% female. The population was made up of 2,301 Swiss men (38.2% of the population) and 578 (9.6%) non-Swiss men. There were 2,571 Swiss women (42.7%) and 578 (9.6%) non-Swiss women. Of the population in the municipality, 1,315, or about 23.6%, were born in Murten and lived there in 2000. There were 881 or 15.8% who were born in the same canton, while 2,088 or 37.4% were born somewhere else in Switzerland, and 1,109 or 19.9% were born outside of Switzerland.

In 2000, children and teenagers (0–19 years old) made up 23.1% of the population, while adults aged 20–64 years comprised 61.2% and seniors (over 64 years old) were 15.7%.

In 2000 there were 2,256 residents who were single and never married in the municipality. There were 2,638 married individuals, 346 widows or widowers and 338 individuals who are divorced.

In 2000, there were 2,394 private households in the municipality, and an average of 2.3 persons per household. There were 801 households that consist of only one person and 143 households with five or more people. In 2000, a total of 2,349 apartments (89.3% of the total) were permanently occupied, while 232 apartments (8.8%) were seasonally occupied and 50 apartments (1.9%) were empty. As of 2009, the construction rate of new housing units was 1.3 new units per 1000 residents. The vacancy rate for the municipality, in 2010, was 0.24%.

The historical population is given in the following chart:

== Heritage sites of national significance ==
The farm house at Erli 2, Murten's city walls, the Grosshaus at Hauptgasse 43, the Rathaus or town council house, Löwenberg Castle and the Old School House in Valvenach are listed as Swiss heritage site of national significance. The entire old city of Murten's and the village of Lurtigen are part of the Inventory of Swiss Heritage Sites.

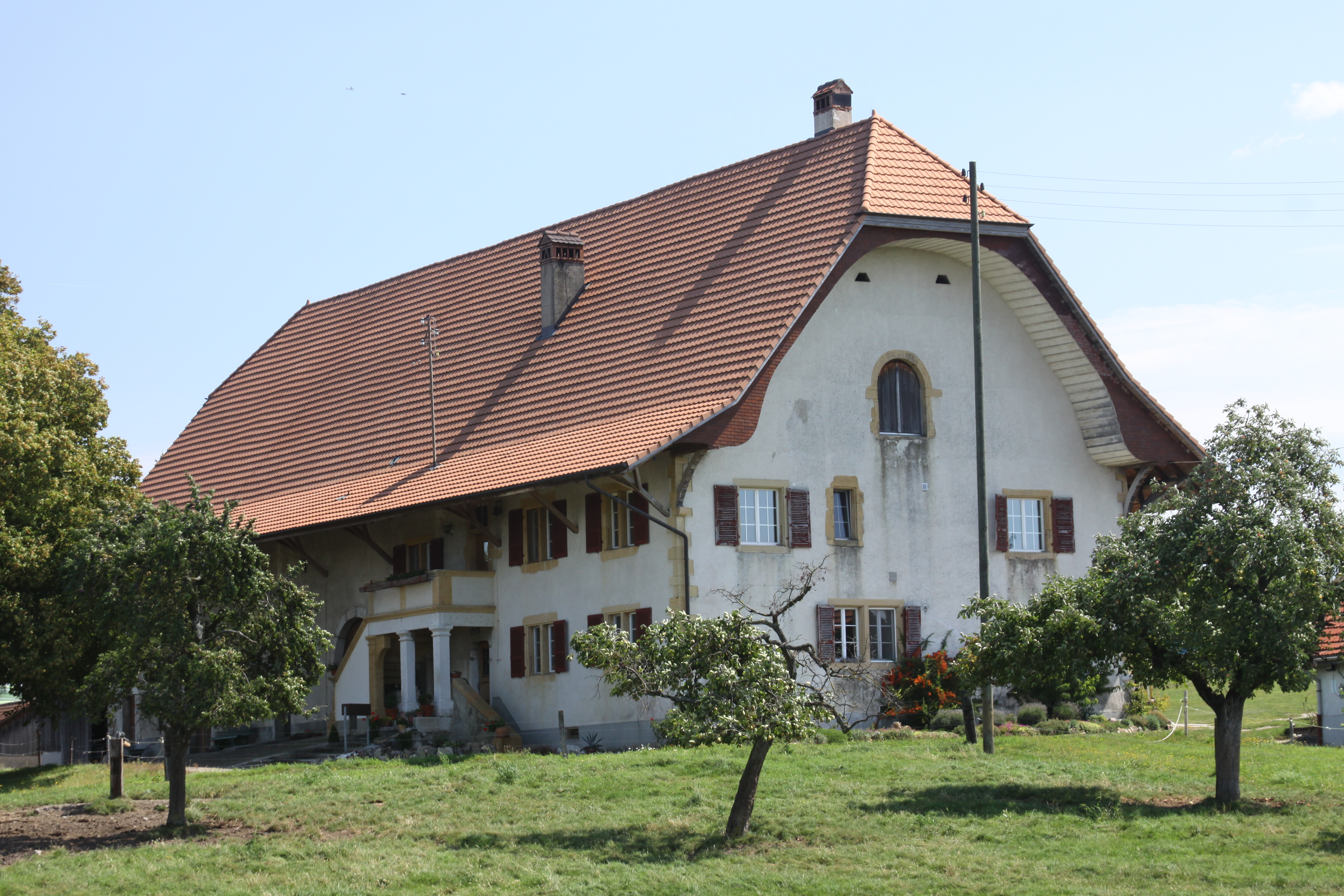
Farm House at Erli 2

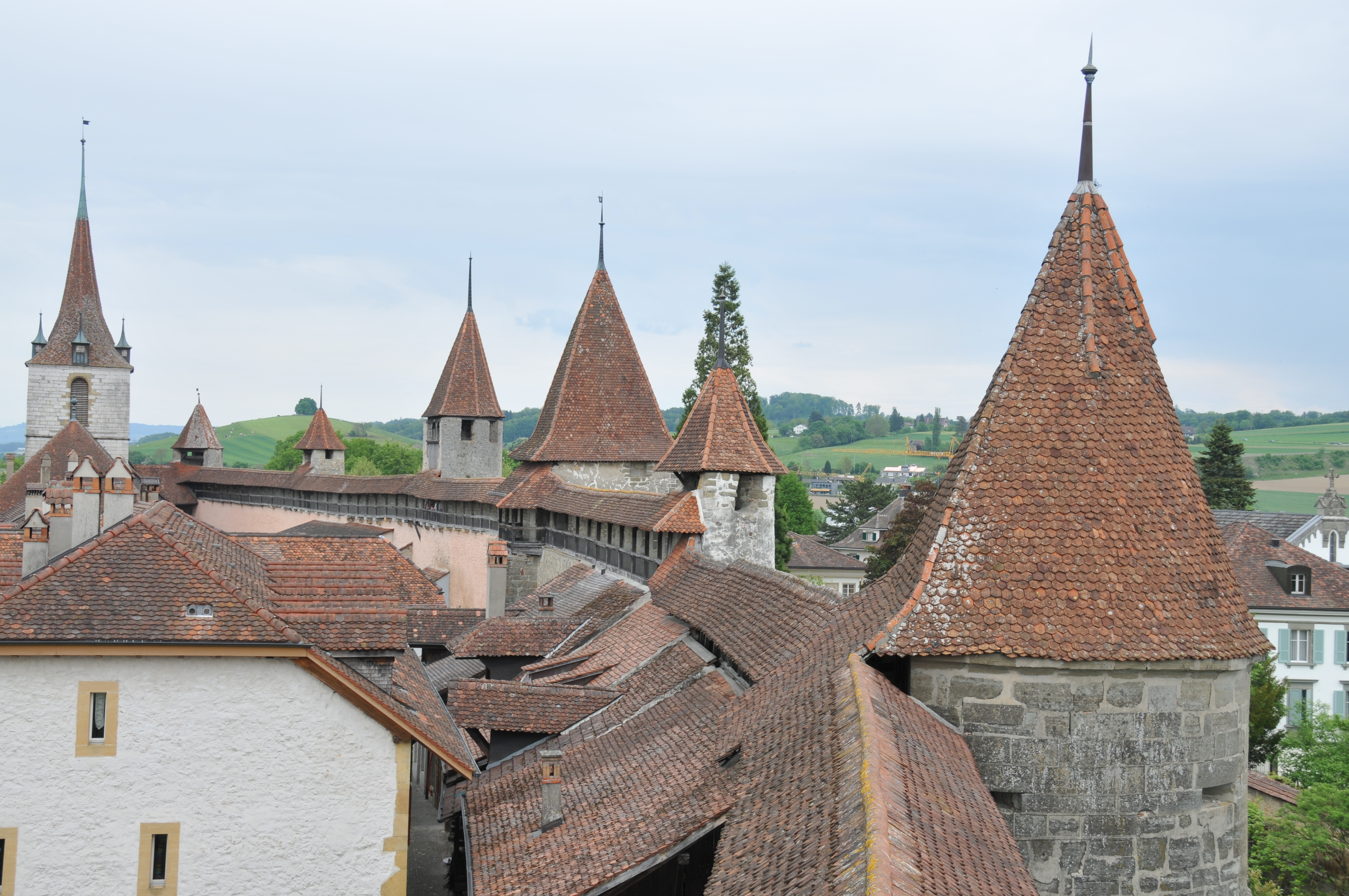
City Walls

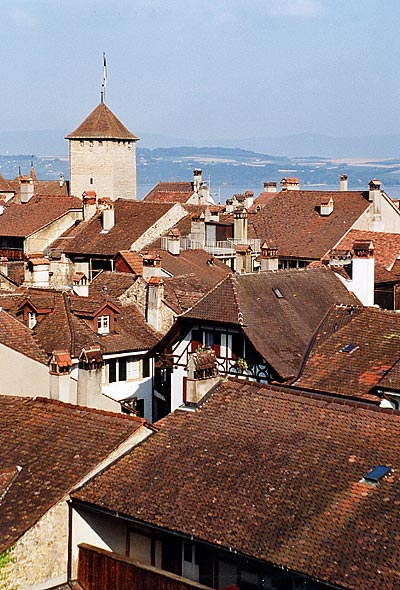
View over the compact old city

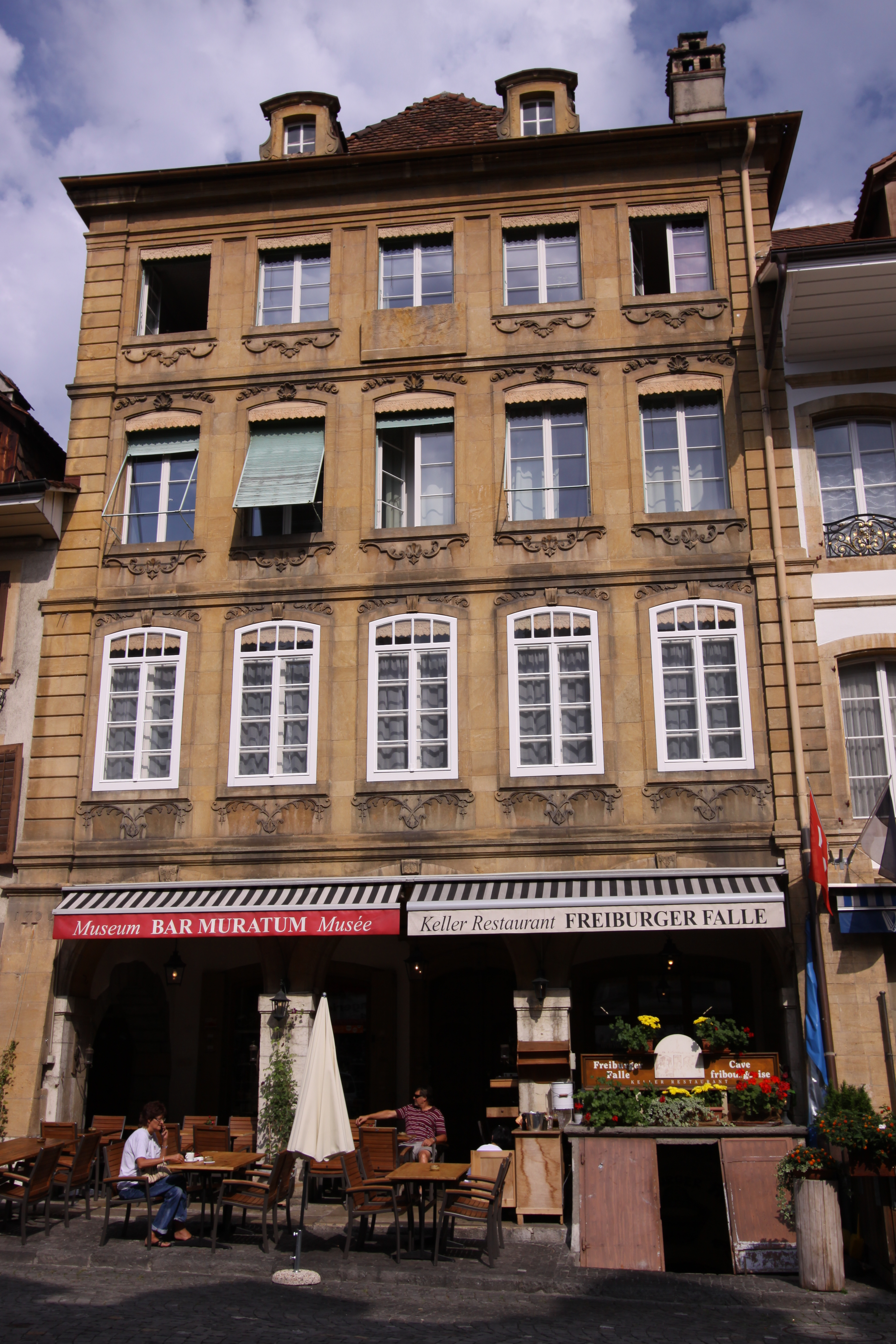
Grosshaus at Hauptgasse 43

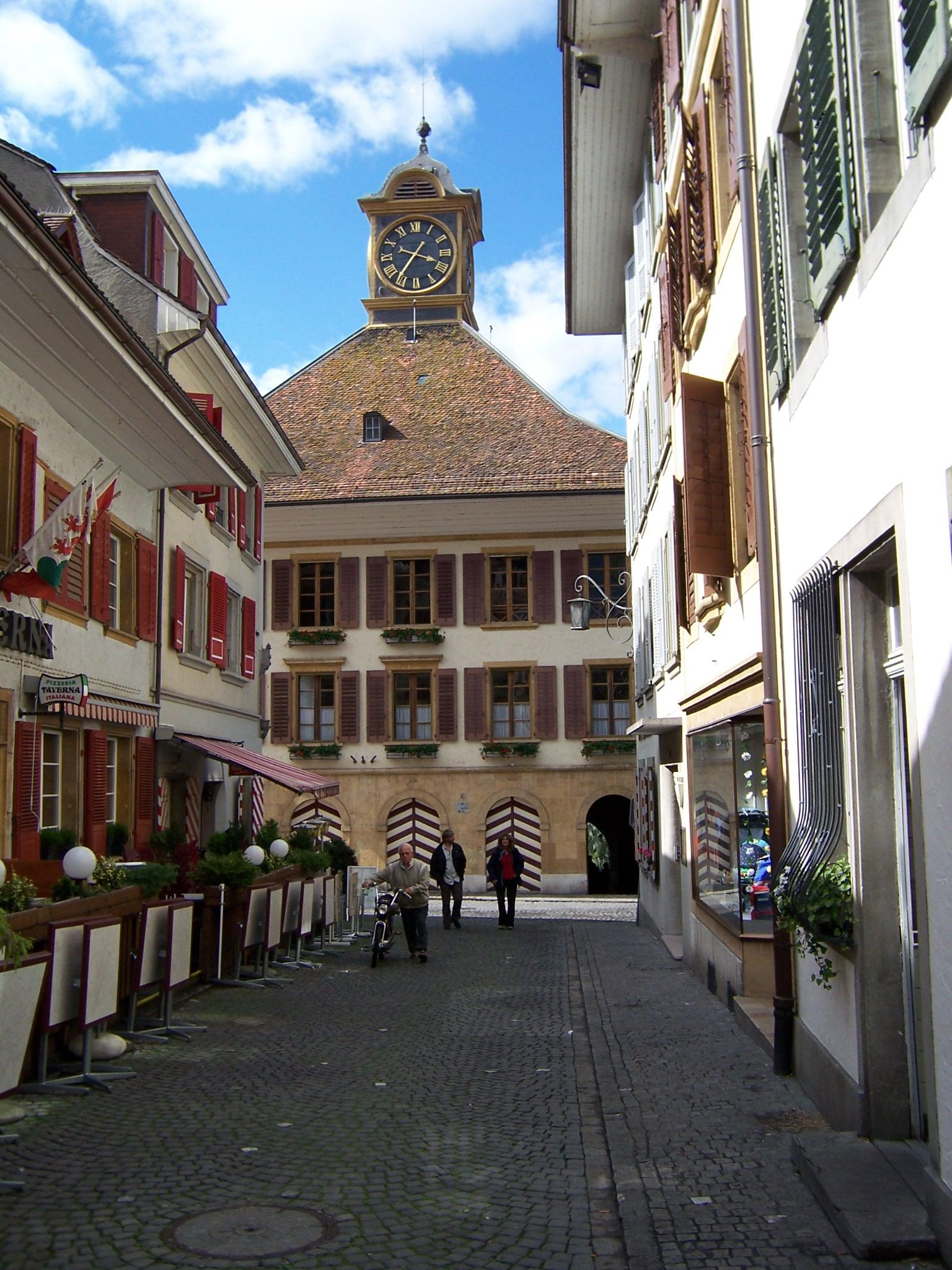
Rathaus (Town council house)

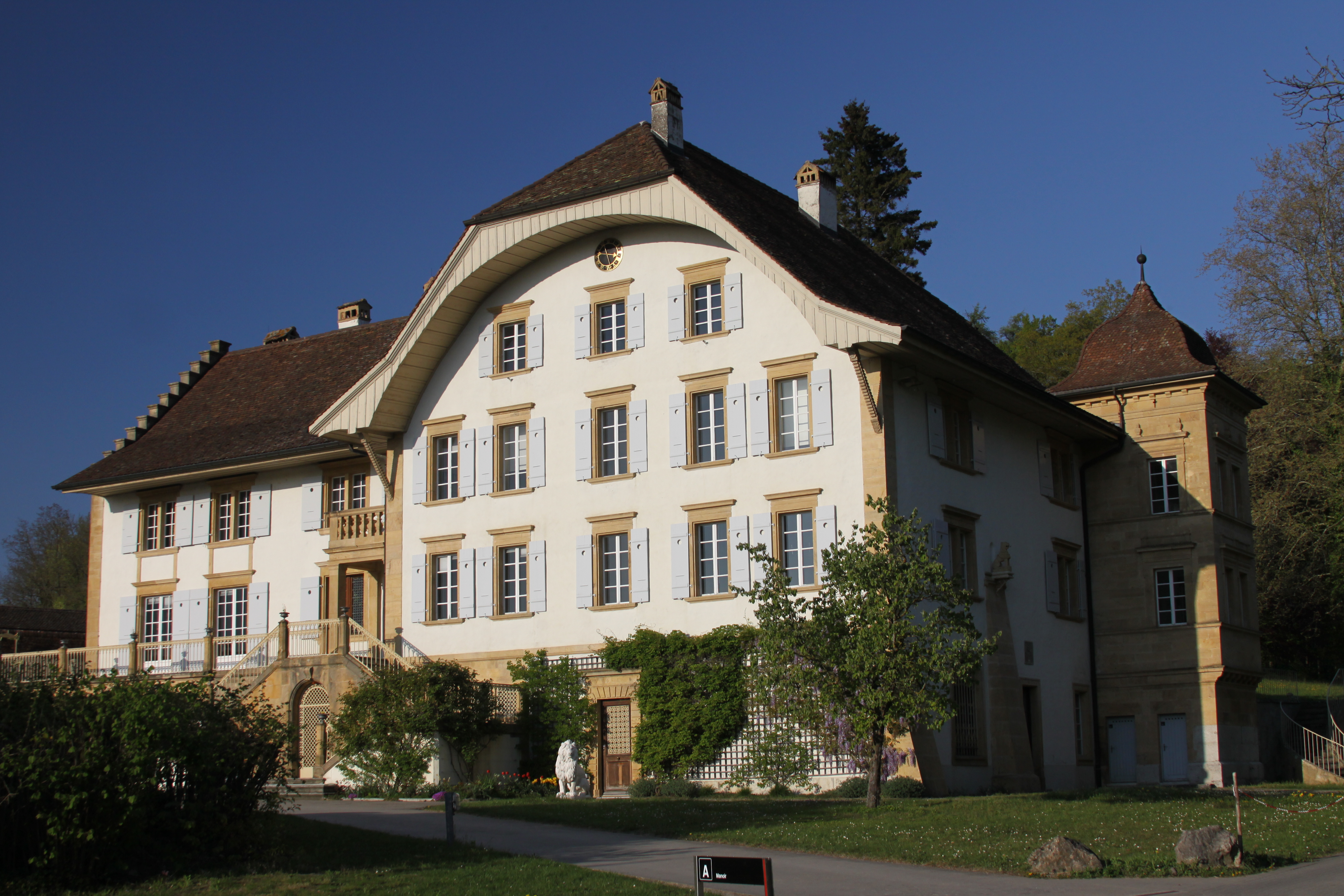
Löwenberg Castle

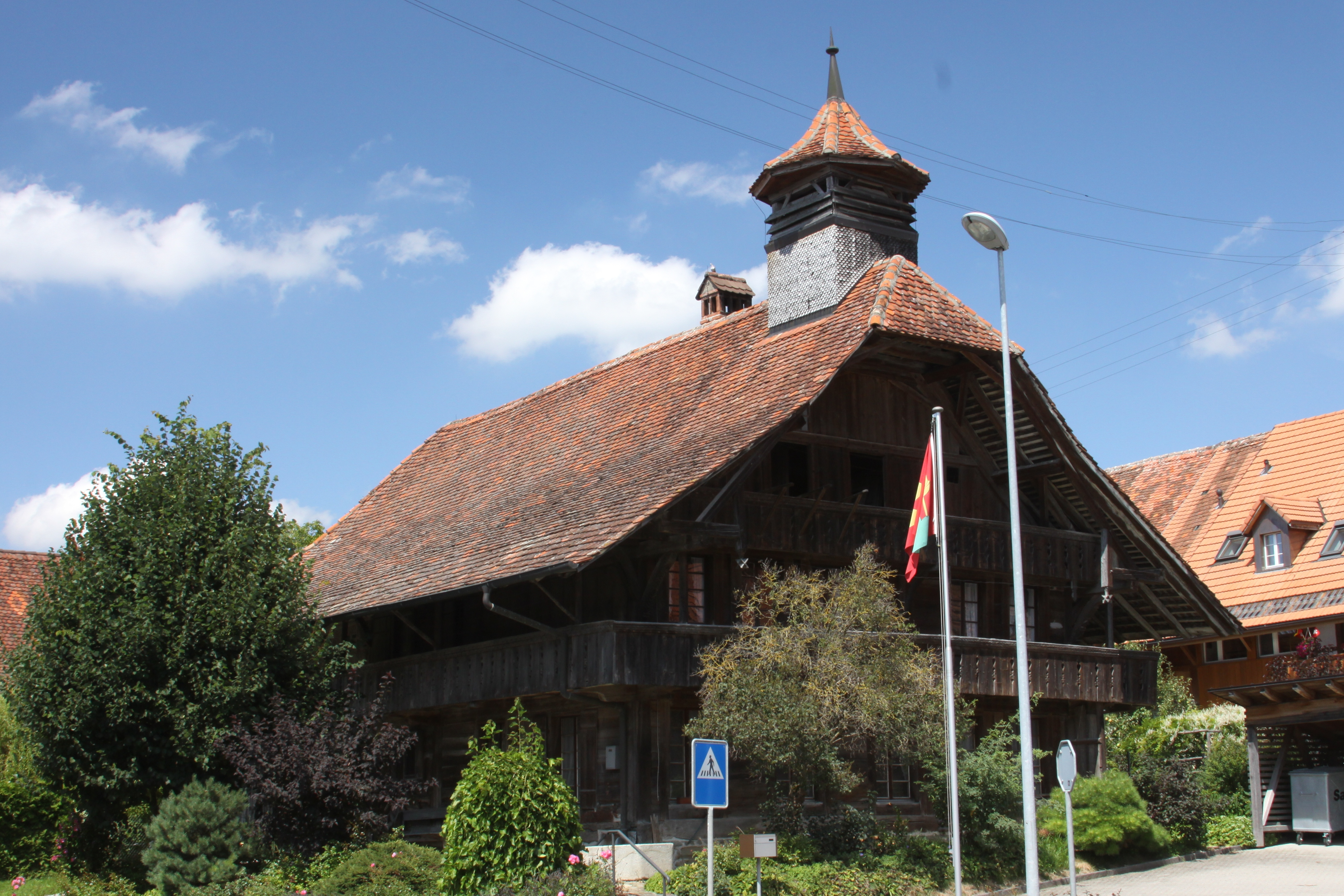
Old school house building

=== World heritage site ===
An area of the prehistoric pile-dwelling (or stilt house) settlement at Segelboothafen is part of the Prehistoric Pile dwellings around the Alps UNESCO World Heritage Site.

The Segelboothafen (sail boat haven/harbour) site is located along the lake shore at the foot of the old town's hill. The site dates to the Middle and Final Neolithic period. Some of the piles were dendrochronologically dated to the late Cortaillod Middle Neolithic around 3552 BC and the Final Neolithic around 2534 BC. The site was first excavated in 1883–84 by Süsstruck. Later excavations found one or two strata that are up to 40 cm (16 in) thick and a field of wooden piles. Archeological finds included pottery, stone tools, wooden objects and animal bones.

== Politics ==
In the 2011 federal election, the most popular party was the SPS which received 22.4% of the vote. The next three most popular parties were the FDP (20.1%), the SVP (19.7%) and the Green Liberal Party (9.1%).

The SPS improved their position in Murten rising to first, from third in 2007 (with 21.6%) The FDP retained about the same popularity (24.0% in 2007), the SVP moved from first in 2007 (with 24.1%) to third and the Grünliberale moved from below fourth place in 2007 to fourth. A total of 2,145 votes were cast in this election, of which 27 or 1.3% were invalid.

== Economy ==
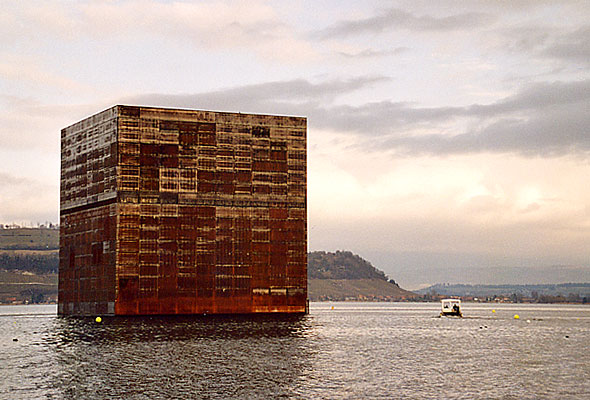
Monolith in Lake Murten for the Expo.02

As of 2010, Murten had an unemployment rate of 3.1%. As of 2008, there were 105 people employed in the primary economic sector and about 25 businesses involved in this sector. 1,374 people were employed in the secondary sector and there were 71 businesses in this sector. 2,263 people were employed in the tertiary sector, with 364 businesses in this sector. There were 2,977 residents of the municipality who were employed in some capacity, of which females made up 44.6% of the workforce.

In 2008 the total number of full-time equivalent jobs was 3,121. The number of jobs in the primary sector was 62, of which 50 were in agriculture and 12 were in forestry or lumber production. The number of jobs in the secondary sector was 1,295 of which 983 or (75.9%) were in manufacturing and 218 (16.8%) were in construction. The number of jobs in the tertiary sector was 1,764. In the tertiary sector, 561 or 31.8% were in wholesale or retail sales or the repair of motor vehicles, 69 or 3.9% were in the movement and storage of goods, 237 or 13.4% were in a hotel or restaurant, 32 or 1.8% were in the information industry, 99 or 5.6% were the insurance or financial industry, 235 or 13.3% were technical professionals or scientists, 103 or 5.8% were in education and 163 or 9.2% were in health care.

In 2000, there were 2,235 workers who commuted into the municipality and 1,649 workers who commuted away. The municipality is a net importer of workers, with about 1.4 workers entering the municipality for every one leaving. Of the working population, 11.3% used public transportation to get to work, and 53% used a private car.

== Religion ==
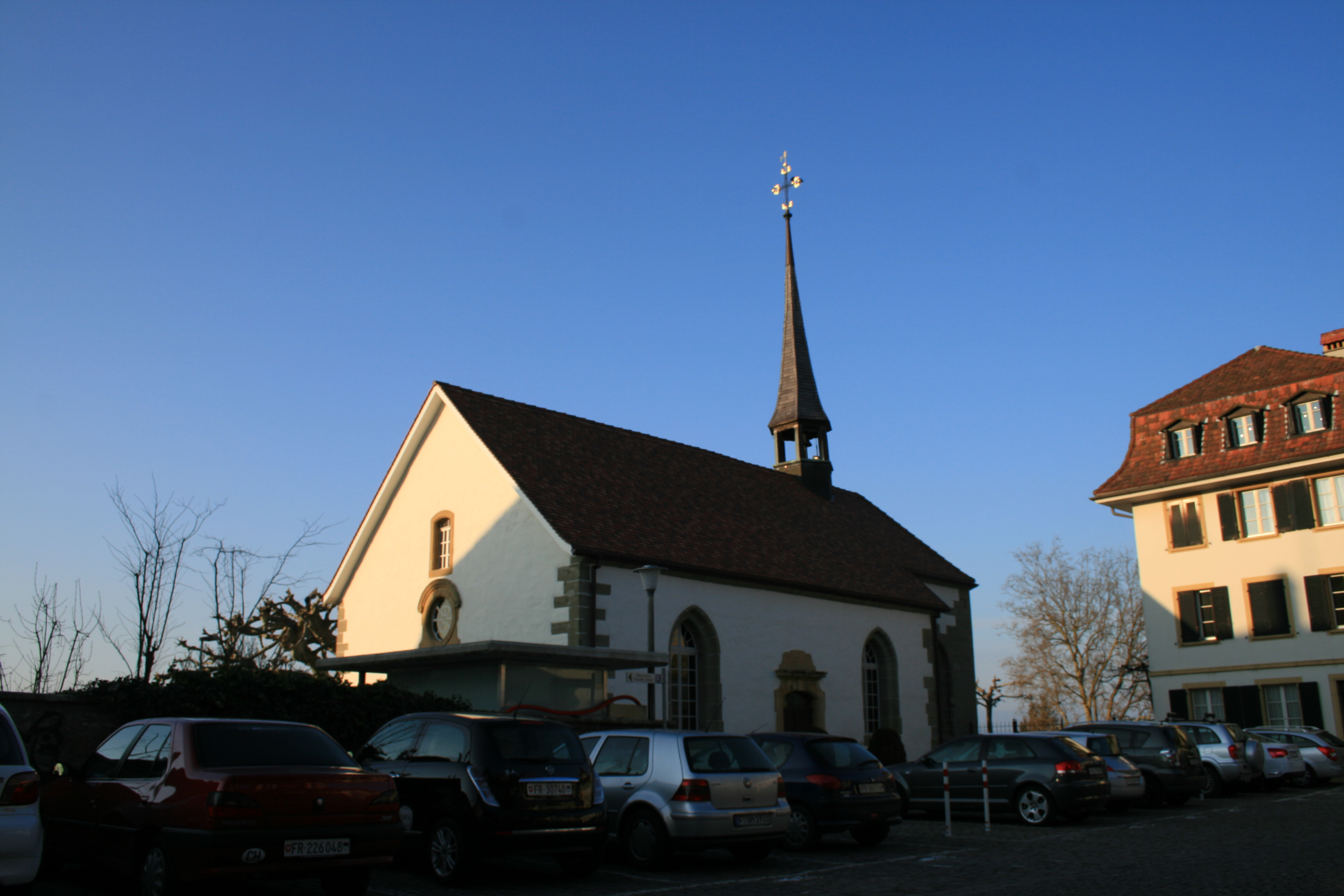
French speaking Reformed church in Morat

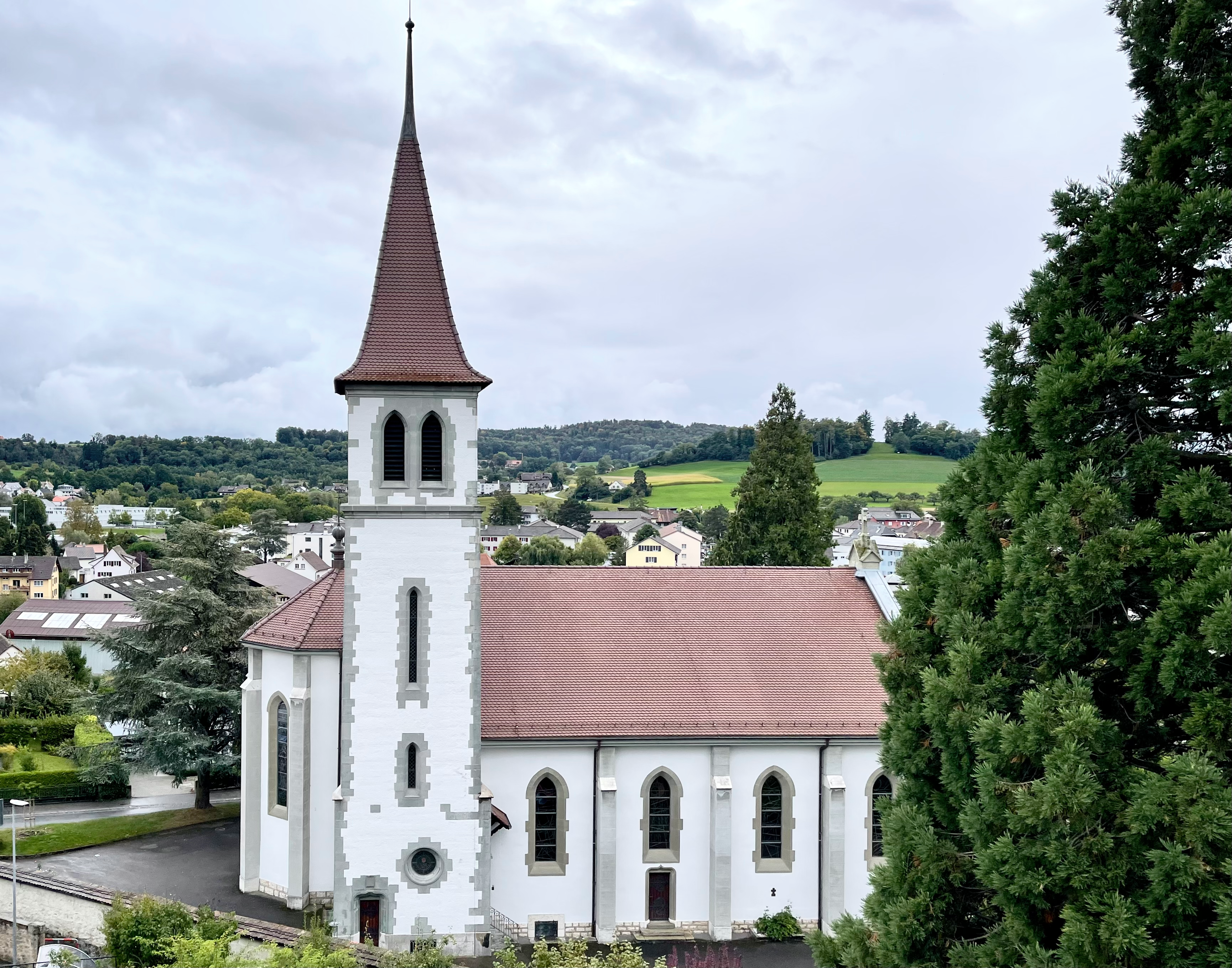
Roman Catholic church in Gothic Revival architecture in Morat

From the 2000 census, 2,661 residents (47.7% of the population) belonged to the Swiss Reformed Church while 1,675 residents or 30.0% were Roman Catholic. Of the rest of the population, there were 96 members of an Orthodox church (or about 1.72% of the population), there were three individuals (0.05% of the population) who belonged to the Christian Catholic Church, and 338 residents (6.06% of the population) belonged to another Christian church. There were two individuals (0.04% of the population) who were Jewish, and 281 (or about 5.04% of the population) who were Muslim. Seven residents were Buddhist, five were Hindu and four adhered to another faith. There were 448 residents (8.03%) who belonged to no church, were agnostic or atheist, and 222 individuals (3.98%) who did not answer the question.

== Weather ==
Murten has an average of 126.2 days of rain or snow per year and on average receives 995 mm (39.2 in) of precipitation. The wettest month is June, during which time Murten receives an average of 106 mm (4.2 in) of rain or snow. During this month there is precipitation for an average of 11 days. The month with the most days of precipitation is May, with an average of 13.3, but with only 96 mm (3.8 in) of rain or snow. The driest month of the year is February with an average of 67 mm (2.6 in) of precipitation over 10 days.

== Education ==
About 2,116 or (37.9%) of the population have completed non-mandatory upper secondary education, and 807 or (14.5%) have completed additional higher education (either university or a Fachhochschule). Of the 807 who completed tertiary schooling, 63.8% were Swiss men, 22.9% were Swiss women, 9.0% were non-Swiss men and 4.2% were non-Swiss women.

The Canton of Fribourg school system provides one year of non-obligatory Kindergarten, followed by six years of Primary school. This is followed by three years of obligatory lower Secondary school where the students are separated according to ability and aptitude. Following the lower Secondary students may attend a three or four year optional upper Secondary school. The upper Secondary school is divided into gymnasium (university preparatory) and vocational programs. After they finish the upper Secondary program, students may choose to attend a Tertiary school or continue their apprenticeship.

During the 2010–11 school year, there were a total of 1,402 students attending 73 classes. A total of 972 students from the municipality attended any school, either in the municipality or outside of it. There were 9 kindergarten classes with a total of 178 students in the municipality. The municipality had 29 primary classes and 601 students. During the same year, there were 34 lower secondary classes with a total of 623 students. There were no upper Secondary classes or vocational classes, but there were 96 upper Secondary students and 97 upper Secondary vocational students who attended classes in another municipality. The municipality had no non-university Tertiary classes, but there were 2 non-university Tertiary students and 17 specialised tertiary students who attended classes in another municipality.

As of 2000, there were 514 students in Murten who came from another municipality, while 211 residents attended schools outside the municipality.

== Transportation ==
The municipality has two railway stations: Murten/Morat and Muntelier-Löwenberg. Both stations are located on the Fribourg–Ins and Palézieux–Lyss lines, with regular service to Lausanne, Kerzers, Fribourg/Freiburg, Neuchâtel, Ins, and Bern.

== Notable people ==
- Jeremias Gotthelf (1797 in Murten – 1854) aka Albert Bitzius, a Swiss novelist.
- Gaston Mullegg (1890 in Murten – 1958) president of the International Rowing Federation from 1949
- Teddy Stauffer (1909 in Murten – 1991) a Swiss bandleader, musician, actor, nightclub owner and restaurateur
- Nuno Reis (born 1991 in Murten) a Portuguese professional footballer
