= Vully =

Vully may refer to the following places in Switzerland:

- Bas-Vully, a former municipality in the district of See in the canton of Fribourg
- Broye-Vully District, a district in Vaud Canton
- Haut-Vully, a former municipality in the district of See/Lac in the canton of Fribourg
- Mont-Vully, a municipality in the district of See in the canton of Fribourg
- Vully-les-Lacs, a municipality in the district of Broye-Vully in the canton of Vaud
- Mont Vully, a hill of the Swiss Plateau
