= François Pantillon =

Swiss conductor, composer and violinist (1928–2025)

- Born: 15 January 1928; La Chaux-de-Fonds, Neuchâtel, Switzerland
- Died: 14 February 2025 (aged 97)
- Occupations: Conductor; composer; violinist

François Pantillon (15 January 1928 – 14 February 2025) was a Swiss conductor, composer and violinist. He is particularly known as choral conductor and has directed the city choirs of Neuchâtel, Bern, and Bienne. From 1986 to 2011 he was the musical director of the City Orchestra of Thun. He was also a regular guest conductor of the Orchestre de la Suisse Romande's summer concerts. His compositions include the opera Die Richterin and the oratorio Clameurs du monde.

== Life and career ==
Pantillon was born in La Chaux-de-Fonds to a musical family. His great-grandfather Zacharie was a violinist who had studied in Berlin under Joseph Joachim and was active in the musical life of La Chaux-de-Fonds, organizing concerts which brought Saint-Saëns, Massenet, and other prominent musicians to the city. His grandfather Georges-Albert was the author of a textbook on solfège which was widely used in the French-speaking schools of Switzerland. His father Georges-Louis (1896-1992), also a violinist and composer, was one of the founders of the Collège musical de La Chaux-de-Fonds (originally known as the Société Suisse de Pédagogie Musicale) and served as its director from 1947 to 1978.

Taught by his father, Pantillon received his first diploma in violin in 1948. He then went to the Royal Conservatory of Brussels where he studied composition, violin, and conducting. At the conservatory he won the First Prize with Distinction in harmony in 1951. The following year he won the First Prize with Distinction in counterpoint, and the First Prize in violin, studying under Carlo Van Neste. He received his diploma in conducting in from the conservatory 1954 and had further studies in conducting under Paul van Kempen at Accademia Musicale Chigiana in Siena and with Franco Ferrara in Hilversum.

On his return to Switzerland, he began an active career as a conductor and composer. He directed the city choirs of Neuchâtel, Bern, and Biel and from 1986 to 2011 he was the musical director of the City Orchestra of Thun. He was also a regular guest conductor of the Orchestre de la Suisse Romande's summer concerts as well making appearances as a guest conductor at international music festivals in Italy, France, Spain, Belgium, England, and Poland. From the early 1960s to the early 1980s he composed around 80 choral pieces and cantatas in the style of Swiss composers such as Gustave Doret, Emile Jaques-Dalcroze, and Carlo Hemmerling. He later adopted a more avant-garde style which grew out of his friendship with Krzysztof Penderecki. Other influences on his later style, which had moved from tonality to polytonality, were Olivier Messiaen and Arthur Honegger. From the early 1980s his compositions were virtually all inspired by his Christian faith and a sense of mysticism. The only exception was his 1991 opera Die Richterin, based on the novella of the same name by Conrad Ferdinand Meyer.

After the 1998 premiere of his sinfonietta Imaginaire Couleur de Ciel, Pantillion composed very little for the next ten years. He retired from active conducting in 2013 but returned to composing after what he termed his "ten-year crisis". In 2015 his concerto for violin and orchestra La clairière, inspired by Alberto Giacometti's sculpture of the same name, was premiered by the Bienne Symphony Orchestra at La Chaux-de-Fonds. In his later years, Pantillon has lived in Lugnorre, near Haut-Vully in the canton of Fribourg. He has seven children from his three marriages.

Pantillon died on 14 February 2025, at the age of 97.
