= Lugnorre =

Village in the canton of Fribourg

- Village
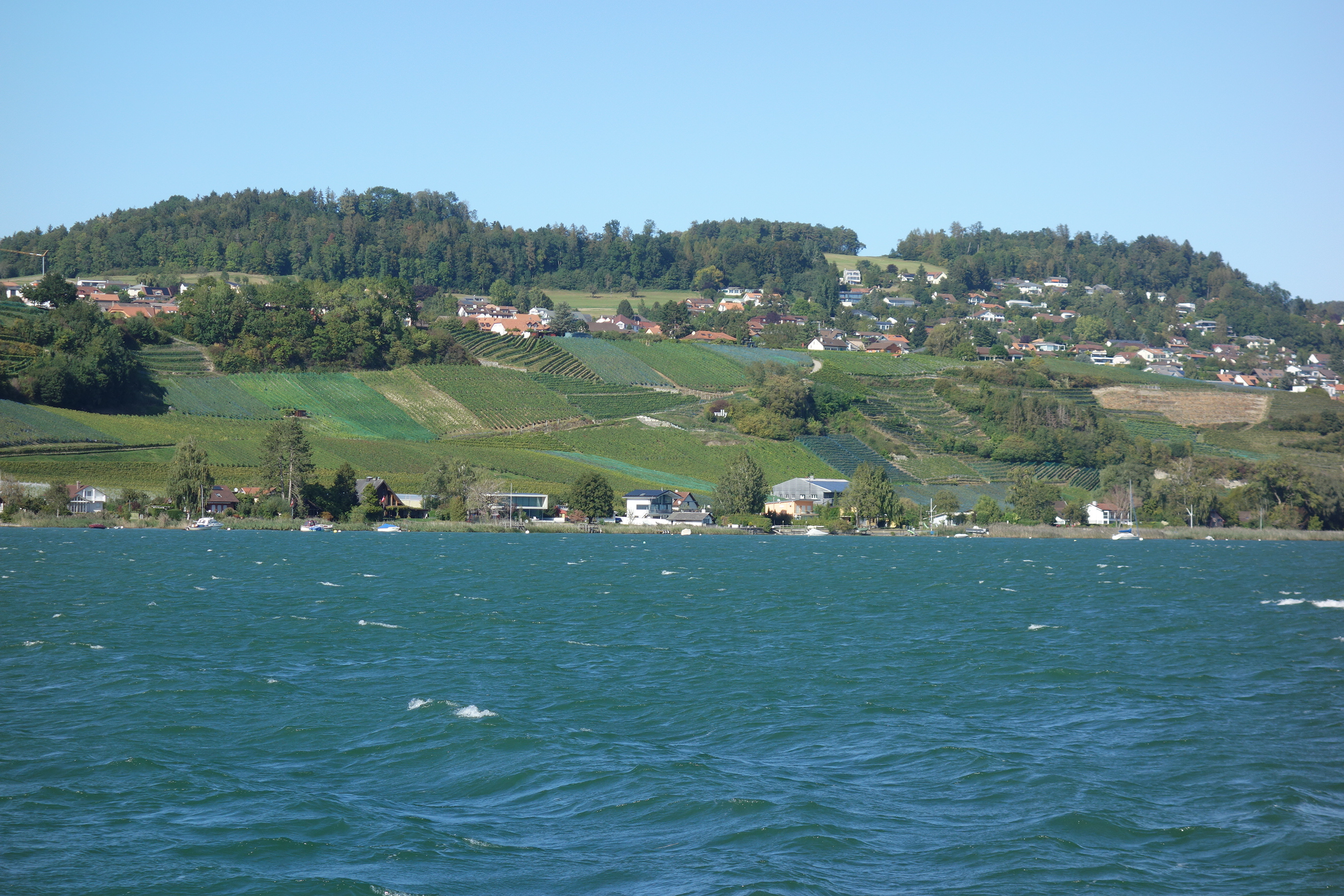
- Lugnorre on Mont Vully

- Location within Switzerland Location within Canton of Fribourg
- Coordinates: 46°56′59″N 7°4′20″E
- Country: Switzerland
- Canton: Fribourg
- Municipality: Mont-Vully

Population (1991)
  - Total: 460

Lugnorre is a village and former lordship in the See/Lac district of the canton of Fribourg, Switzerland. It belonged to the former municipality of Haut-Vully and has been part of the municipality of Mont-Vully since 2016. The village lies on the south-western slope of Mont Vully.

== History ==
Lugnorre is first mentioned in 1079 as Leuconatres. In that year Burchard of Oltigen, bishop of Lausanne, owned property in Lugnorre, the usufruct of which went to the chapter. In 1183 Payerne Priory had vineyards in the village.

Early documents rarely distinguish between the village and the lordship of Lugnorre, which appears clearly as an administrative unit only in the 14th century. The lordship belonged to the lords of Grandson; in 1350 Othon II ceded it, with a right of repurchase, to Louis of Neuchâtel. The inhabitants obtained franchises (liberties), which were set down in writing in 1398. From the end of the Middle Ages to the end of the Ancien Régime the lordship comprised Lugnorre, Môtier, Joressant and part of Mur. At the end of the Middle Ages it was administered by a council, a court of justice with twelve members, a steward (major) and an usher (huissier). They sat in the former steward's house (majorie) on the public square, where trials and assemblies were held; in 1758 the square was still called the place de carcan (pillory square).

In 1469 Amadeus IX of Savoy sold the lordship of Lugnorre to the town of Murten, which had to hand it over to Bern and Fribourg in 1475. From 1484 it was part of the common bailiwick of Murten. In 1798 it was assigned to the canton of Fribourg, which placed it in the district of Avenches and then, from 1803 to 1848, in the district of Murten.

The village, with its houses built side by side and often of Hauterive stone, consisted of two parts, Lugnorre and Chenaux. Lugnorre had a school from 1729; the present building dates from 1853 and was enlarged in 1904. The village is devoted to agriculture and dairy farming. Its first cheese dairy opened around 1840, and the present one dates from 1910.

Lugnorre had 20 hearths in 1559, 29 dwellings in 1613 and in 1657, 67 in 1812 and 42 in 1850/1851. It had 460 inhabitants in 1991.

== Bibliography ==
- Histoire du canton de Fribourg, vol. 1, 1981, pp. 233–235
- Les monuments d'art et d'histoire du canton de Fribourg, vol. 4, 1989, pp. 287–296
