= Bas-Vully =

- Former municipality
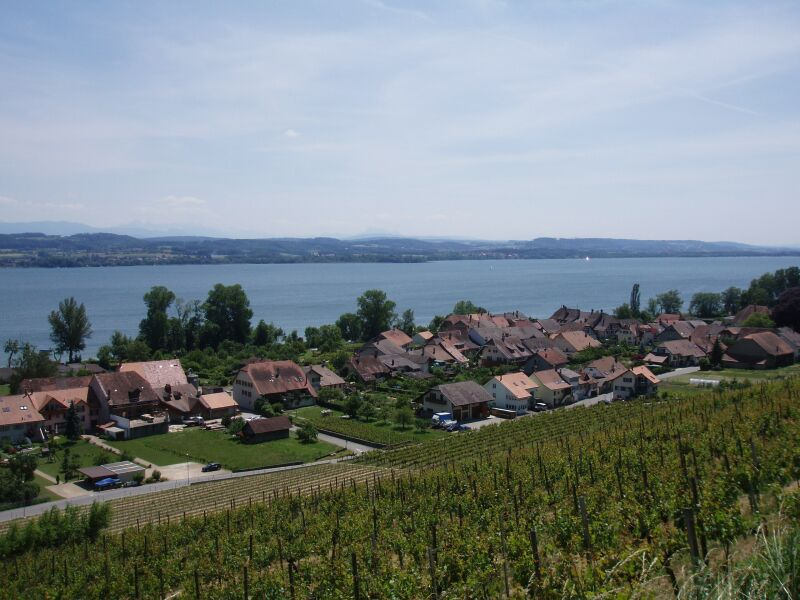
- Praz village

- Coat of arms
- Location of Bas-Vully
- Location within Switzerland Location within Canton of Fribourg
- Coordinates: 46°58′N 7°7′E
- Country: Switzerland
- Canton: Fribourg
- District: See

Government
  - Executive: Conseil communal with 7 members
  - Mayor: Syndic

Area
  - Total: 9.95 km^{2} (3.84 sq mi)
- Elevation: 433 m (1,421 ft)

Population (December 2020)
  - Total: 2,120
  - Density: 213/km^{2} (552/sq mi)
- Time zone: UTC+01:00 (CET)
  - Summer (DST): UTC+02:00 (CEST)
- Postal codes: 1786 Sugiez; 1788 Praz
- SFOS number: 2280
- ISO 3166 code: CH-FR
- Surrounded by: Galmiz, Haut-Vully, Ins (BE), Muntelier, Müntschemier (BE), Murten/Morat
- Website: mont-vully.ch

Bas-Vully (Arpitan: Bâs-Vulyi) is a former municipality in the district of See in the canton of Fribourg in Switzerland. On 1 January 2016 the former municipalities of Bas-Vully and Haut-Vully merged to form Mont-Vully.

== History ==
Bas-Vully is first mentioned in 968 as Williacense. Until 1831 it was known as vor Commune générale des quatre villages de La Rivière. The municipality was formerly known by its German name Unterwistenlach; however, that name is no longer used.

== Geography ==
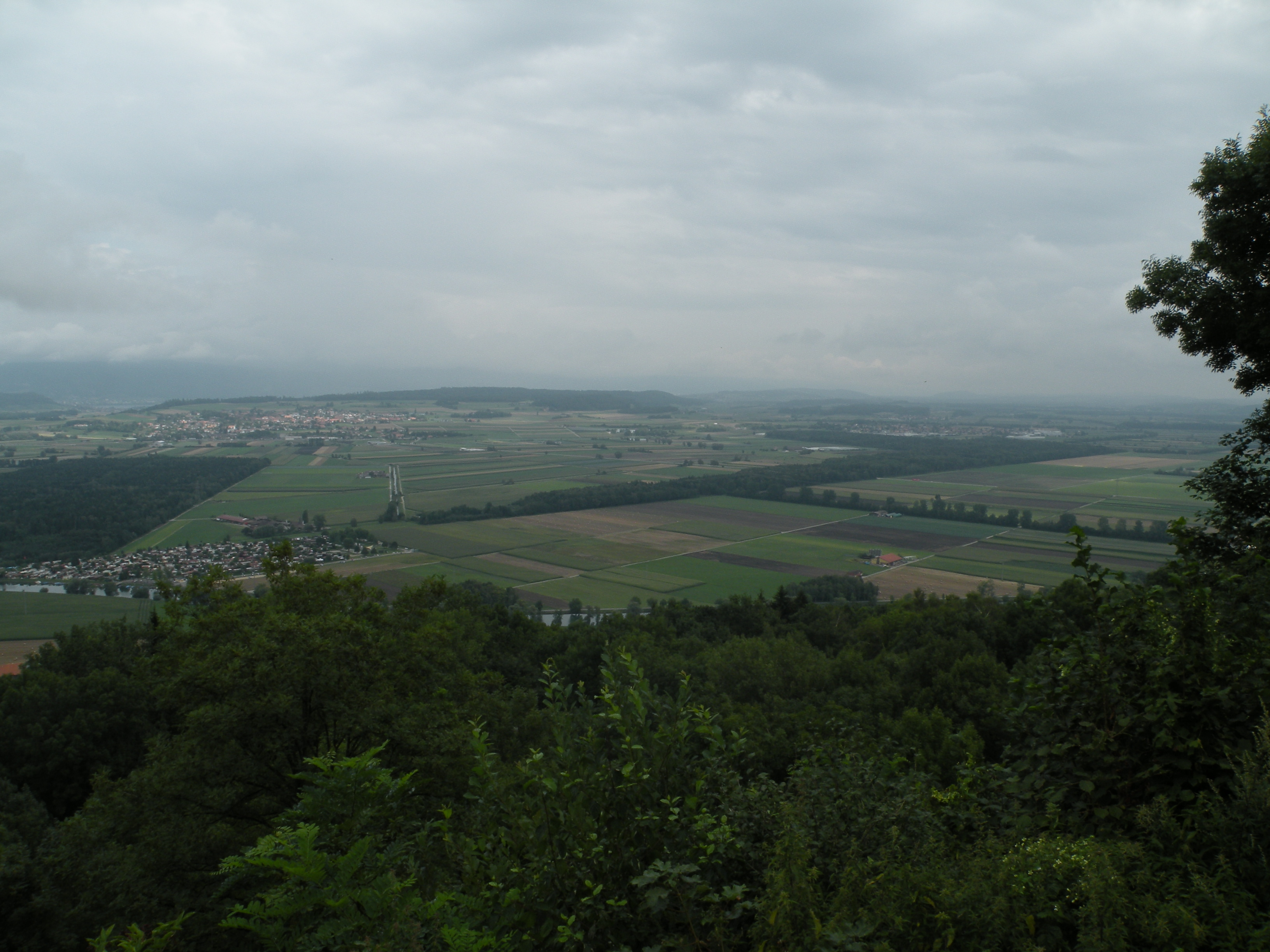
View from Mont Vully over the surrounding landscape

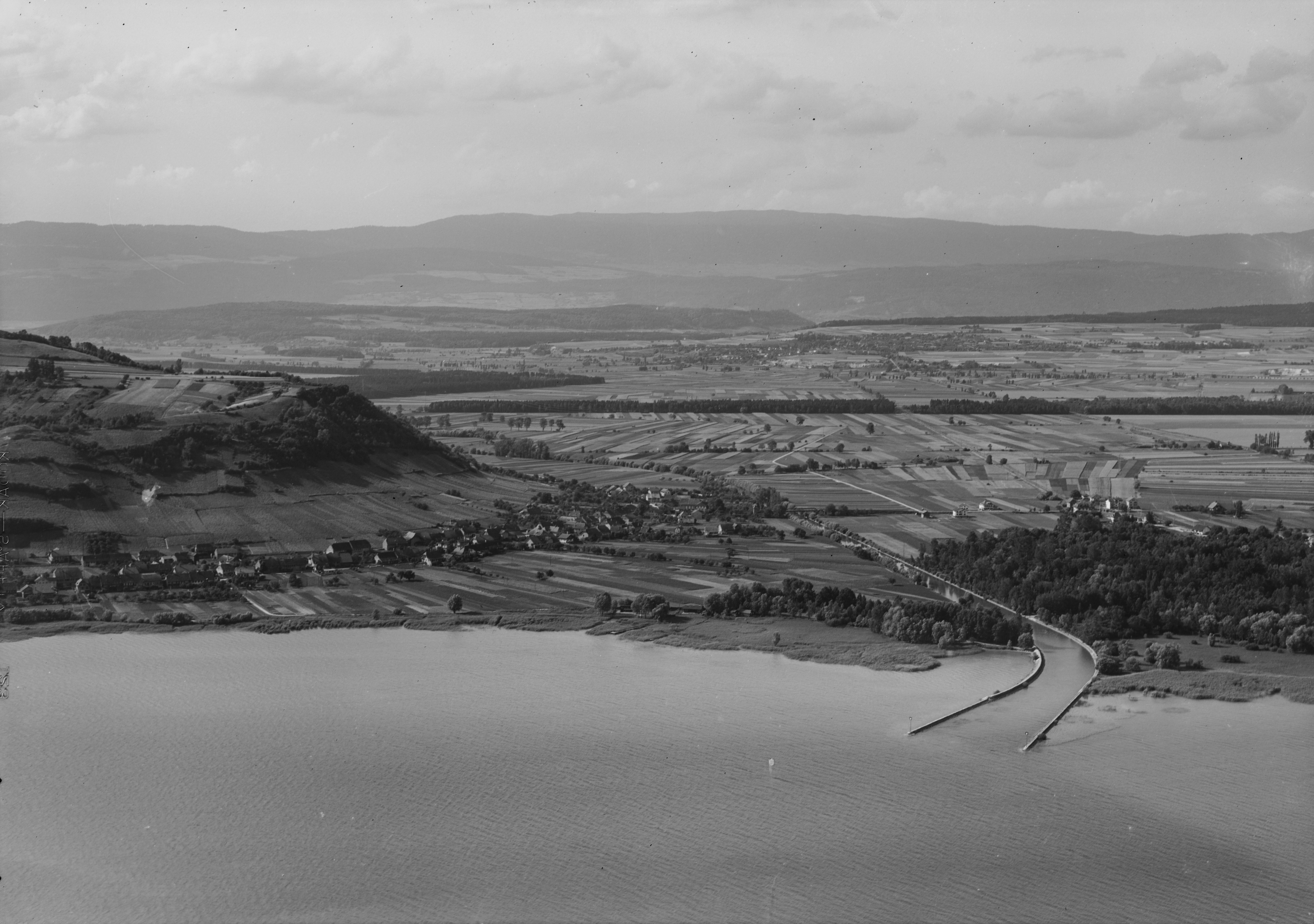
Aerial view (1954)

Bas-Vully had an area, as of 2009, of 10 square kilometers (3.9 mi^{2}). Of this area, 6.98 km^{2} (2.69 mi^{2}) or 70.2% is used for agricultural purposes, while 1.25 km^{2} (0.48 mi^{2}) or 12.6% is forested. Of the rest of the land, 1.37 km^{2} (0.53 mi^{2}) or 13.8% is settled (buildings or roads), 0.29 km^{2} (0.11 mi^{2}) or 2.9% is either rivers or lakes and 0.06 km^{2} (15 acres) or 0.6% is unproductive land.

Of the built up area, housing and buildings made up 6.5% and transportation infrastructure made up 3.5%. while parks, green belts and sports fields made up 2.1%. Out of the forested land, 11.1% of the total land area is heavily forested and 1.5% is covered with orchards or small clusters of trees. Of the agricultural land, 53.7% is used for growing crops and 9.9% is pastures, while 6.5% is used for orchards or vine crops. All the water in the municipality is flowing water.

The former municipality is located in the See/Lac district, at the foot of Mont Vully. It consists of the hamlets of Praz, Nant, Sugiez and the abandoned settlement of Chaumont. Bas-Vully is located 3.5 km (2.2 mi) to the north of Murten. The three villages of Suigez, Nant and Praz, due to their close proximity, now form a single urban area. The municipality extends from the north shore of Lake Murten to the foot of Mount Vully.

The Broye Canal, linking Lake Murten to Lake Neuchâtel, passes through the town.

== Coat of arms ==
The municipal coat of arms is made up of the coats of arms from the three villages (Nant, Praz and Sugiez) that formed Bas-Vully in 1850.

== Demographics ==
Bas-Vully had a population (as of 2014) of 2,098. As of 2008, 19.4% of the population are resident foreign nationals. Over the last 10 years (2000–2010) the population has changed at a rate of 31%. Migration accounted for 24.3%, while births and deaths accounted for 5%.

Most of the population (as of 2000) speaks French (971 or 58.6%) as their first language, German is the second most common (503 or 30.4%) and Portuguese is the third (53 or 3.2%). There are 18 people who speak Italian and 2 people who speak Romansh.

As of 2008, the population was 52.0% male and 48.0% female. The population was made up of 769 Swiss men (38.6% of the population) and 268 (13.4%) non-Swiss men. There were 784 Swiss women (39.3%) and 173 (8.7%) non-Swiss women. Of the population in the municipality, 496 or about 30.0% were born in Bas-Vully and lived there in 2000. There were 276 or 16.7% who were born in the same canton, while 487 or 29.4% were born somewhere else in Switzerland, and 240 or 14.5% were born outside of Switzerland.

As of 2000, children and teenagers (0–19 years old) make up 20.4% of the population, while adults (20–64 years old) make up 65.2% and seniors (over 64 years old) make up 14.5%.

As of 2000, there were 610 people who were single and never married in the municipality. There were 871 married individuals, 93 widows or widowers and 82 individuals who are divorced.

As of 2000, there were 637 private households in the municipality, and an average of 2.3 persons per household. There were 182 households that consist of only one person and 30 households with five or more people. In 2000, a total of 610 apartments (79.7% of the total) were permanently occupied, while 122 apartments (15.9%) were seasonally occupied and 33 apartments (4.3%) were empty. As of 2009, the construction rate of new housing units was 6.8 new units per 1000 residents. The vacancy rate for the municipality, in 2010, was 0.65%.

The historical population is given in the following chart:

== Heritage sites of national significance ==
The De Steiger House, the d’Erlach-Velga House, the de Wattenwyl House and the oppidum of Mont Vully are listed as Swiss heritage site of national significance. The entire village of Praz is part of the Inventory of Swiss Heritage Sites.

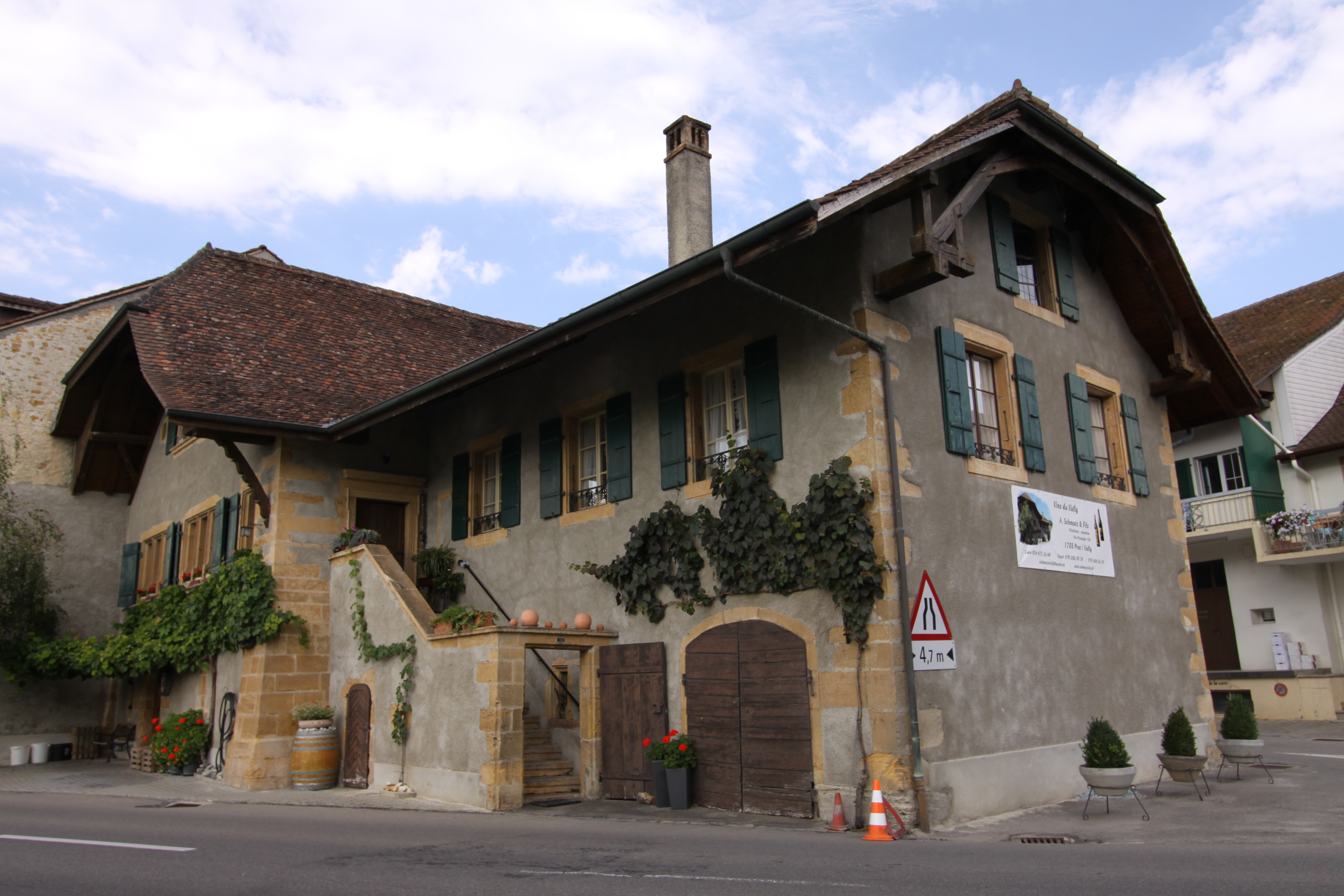
De Steiger House

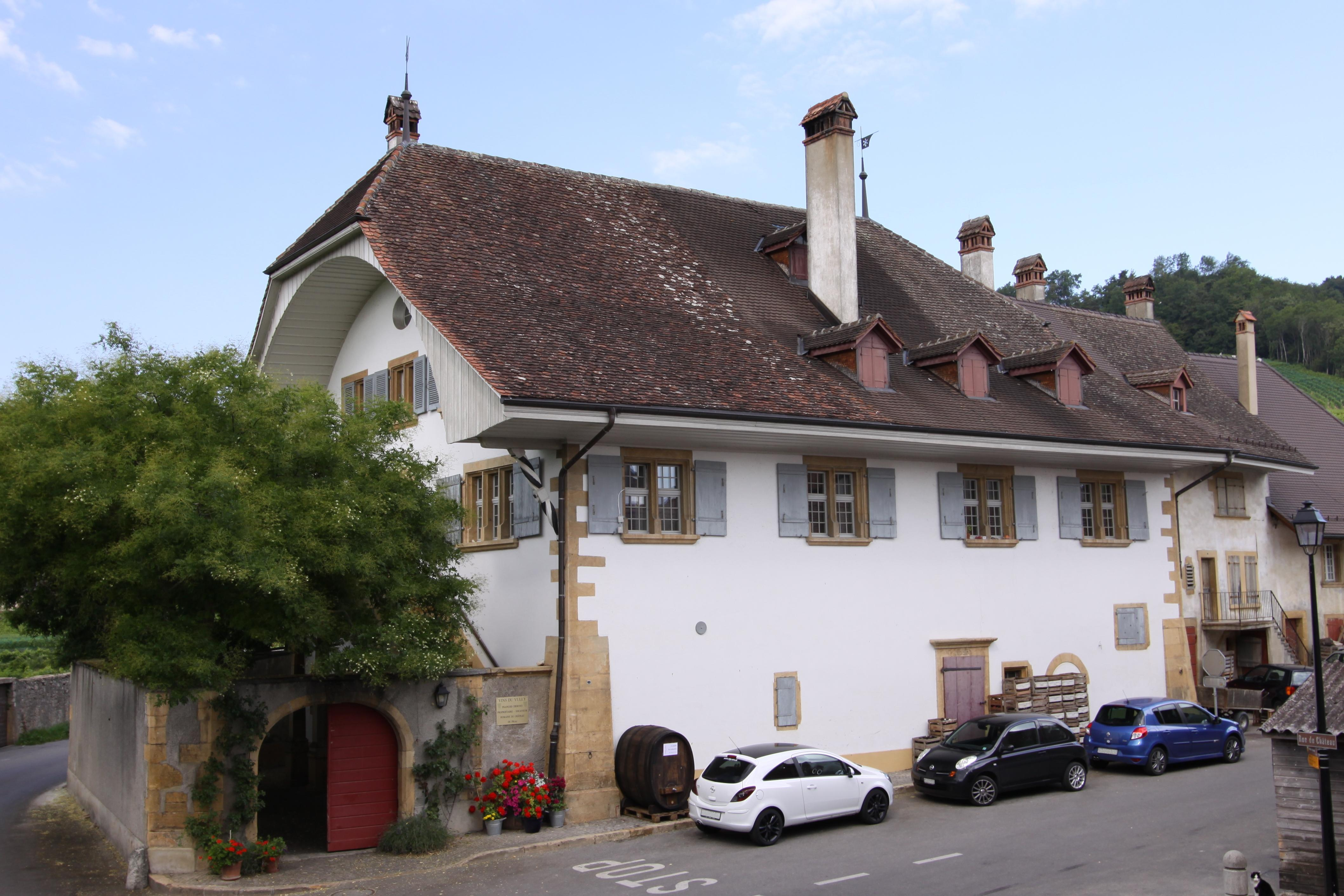
d’Erlach-Velga House

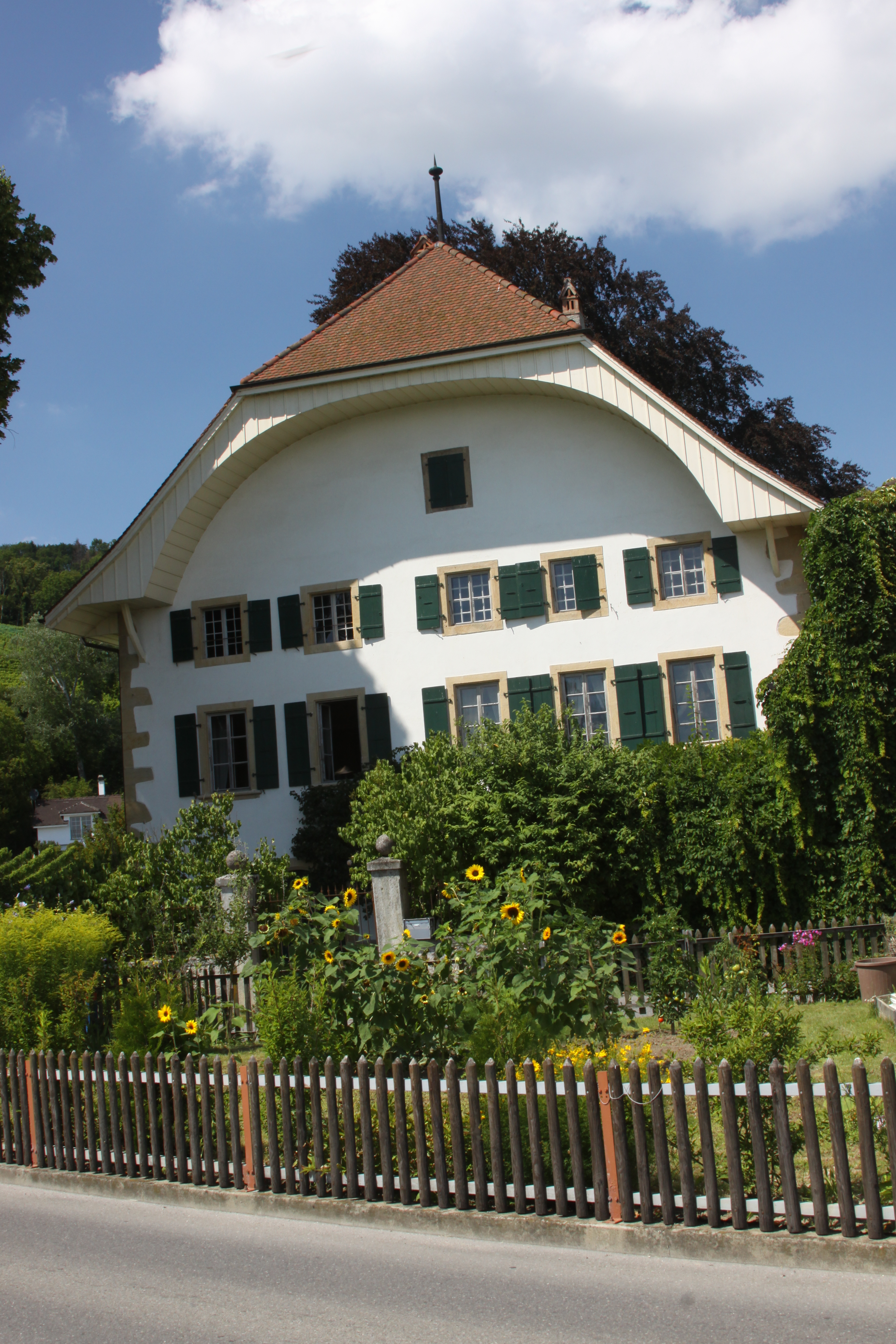
de Wattenwyl House

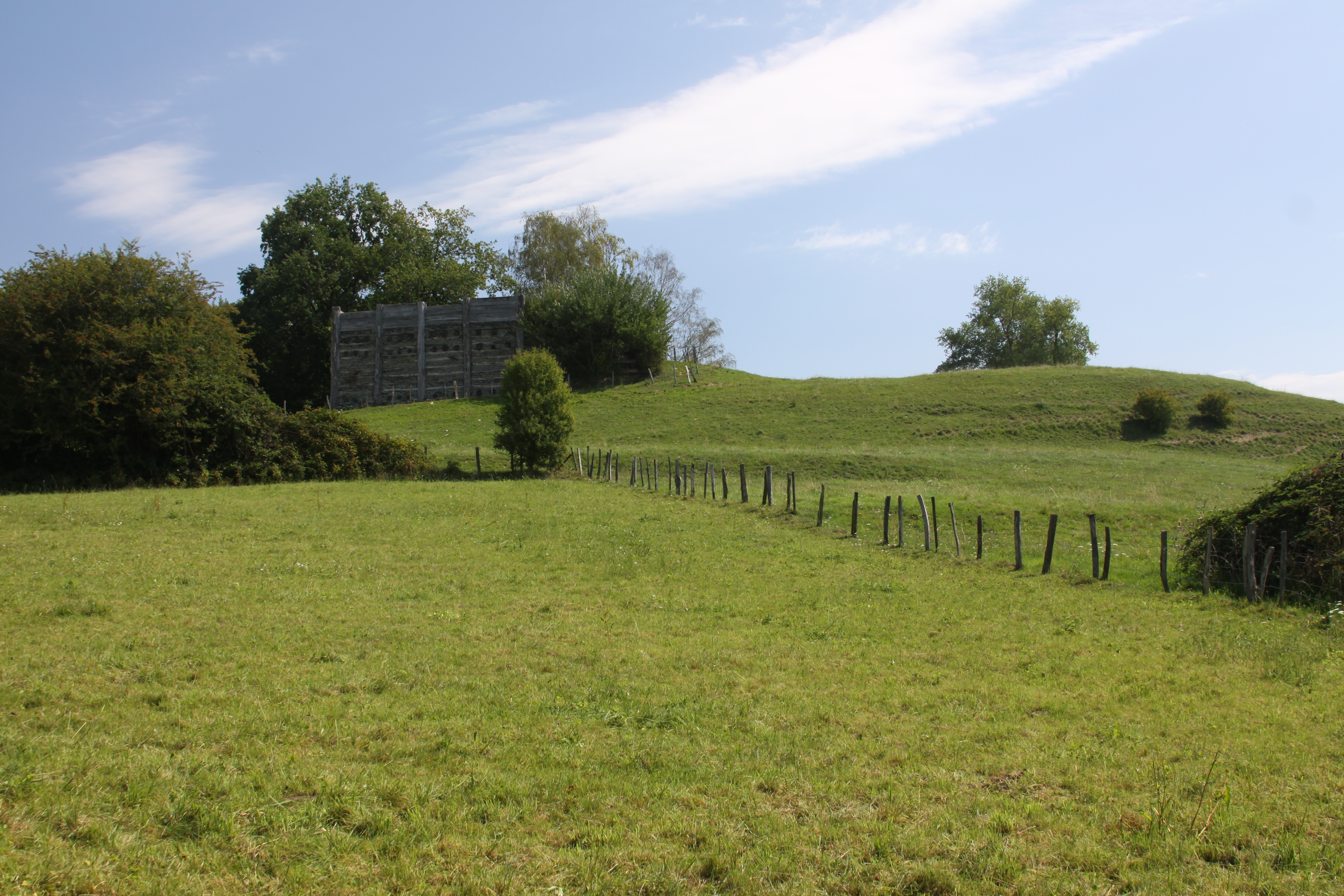
Mont Vully

== Politics ==
In the 2011 federal election the most popular party was the SPS which received 22.7% of the vote. The next three most popular parties were the SVP (21.3%), the FDP (20.6%) and the CVP (12.3%).

The SPS improved their position in Bas-Vully rising to first, from third in 2007 (with 20.4%) The SVP moved from first in 2007 (with 26.1%) to second in 2011, the FDP moved from second in 2007 (with 24.2%) to third and the CVP retained about the same popularity (14.6% in 2007). A total of 649 votes were cast in this election, of which 10 or 1.5% were invalid.

== Economy ==
As of 2010, Bas-Vully had an unemployment rate of 1.6%. As of 2008, there were 82 people employed in the primary economic sector and about 20 businesses involved in this sector. 94 people were employed in the secondary sector and there were 21 businesses in this sector. 543 people were employed in the tertiary sector, with 71 businesses in this sector. There were 947 residents of the municipality who were employed in some capacity, of which females made up 36.7% of the workforce.

In 2008 the total number of full-time equivalent jobs was 615. The number of jobs in the primary sector was 66, all of which were in agriculture. The number of jobs in the secondary sector was 84 of which 32 or (38.1%) were in manufacturing, 1 was in mining and 43 (51.2%) were in construction. The number of jobs in the tertiary sector was 465. In the tertiary sector; 108 or 23.2% were in wholesale or retail sales or the repair of motor vehicles, 20 or 4.3% were in the movement and storage of goods, 72 or 15.5% were in a hotel or restaurant, 2 or 0.4% were in the information industry, 6 or 1.3% were the insurance or financial industry, 11 or 2.4% were technical professionals or scientists, 10 or 2.2% were in education and 45 or 9.7% were in health care.

In 2000, there were 273 workers who commuted into the municipality and 588 workers who commuted away. The municipality is a net exporter of workers, with about 2.2 workers leaving the municipality for every one entering. Of the working population, 9.4% used public transportation to get to work, and 64% used a private car.

== Religion ==
From the 2000 census, 518 or 31.3% were Roman Catholic, while 875 or 52.8% belonged to the Swiss Reformed Church. Of the rest of the population, there were 14 members of an Orthodox church (or about 0.85% of the population), there were 2 individuals (or about 0.12% of the population) who belonged to the Christian Catholic Church, and there were 34 individuals (or about 2.05% of the population) who belonged to another Christian church. There were 70 (or about 4.23% of the population) who were Islamic. There were 2 individuals who were Buddhist and 2 individuals who were Hindu. 118 (or about 7.13% of the population) belonged to no church, are agnostic or atheist, and 38 individuals (or about 2.29% of the population) did not answer the question.

== Education ==
In Bas-Vully about 619 or (37.4%) of the population have completed non-mandatory upper secondary education, and 188 or (11.4%) have completed additional higher education (either university or a Fachhochschule). Of the 188 who completed tertiary schooling, 62.2% were Swiss men, 25.5% were Swiss women, 6.9% were non-Swiss men and 5.3% were non-Swiss women.

The Canton of Fribourg school system provides one year of non-obligatory Kindergarten, followed by six years of Primary school. This is followed by three years of obligatory lower Secondary school where the students are separated according to ability and aptitude. Following the lower Secondary students may attend a three or four year optional upper Secondary school. The upper Secondary school is divided into gymnasium (university preparatory) and vocational programs. After they finish the upper Secondary program, students may choose to attend a Tertiary school or continue their apprenticeship.

During the 2010-11 school year, there were a total of 142 students attending 7 classes in Bas-Vully. A total of 262 students from the municipality attended any school, either in the municipality or outside of it. There was one kindergarten class with a total of 16 students in the municipality. The municipality had 6 primary classes and 126 students. During the same year, there were no lower secondary classes in the municipality, but 77 students attended lower secondary school in a neighboring municipality. There were no upper Secondary classes or vocational classes, but there were 8 upper Secondary students and 42 upper Secondary vocational students who attended classes in another municipality. The municipality had no non-university Tertiary classes, but there was one non-university Tertiary student and 10 specialized Tertiary students who attended classes in another municipality.

As of 2000, there were 15 students in Bas-Vully who came from another municipality, while 114 residents attended schools outside the municipality.
