= Muntelier =

- Municipality
- Coat of arms
- Location of Muntelier
- Location within Switzerland Location within Canton of Fribourg
- Coordinates: 46°56′N 7°7′E
- Country: Switzerland
- Canton: Fribourg
- District: See

Government
  - Executive: Gemeinderat with 5 members
  - Mayor: Ammann

Area
  - Total: 1.13 km^{2} (0.44 sq mi)
- Elevation: 435 m (1,427 ft)

Population (December 2020)
  - Total: 976
  - Density: 864/km^{2} (2,240/sq mi)
- Time zone: UTC+01:00 (CET)
  - Summer (DST): UTC+02:00 (CEST)
- Postal code: 3286
- SFOS number: 2274
- ISO 3166 code: CH-FR
- Surrounded by: Bas-Vully, Galmiz, Murten/Morat
- Twin towns: Castiglione Falletto (Italy)
- Website: www.muntelier.ch

Muntelier (French name: Montilier; Arpitan: Monteliér [mɔ̃tiˈʎi]) is a municipality in the district of See in the canton of Fribourg in Switzerland. It is one of the municipalities with a large majority of German speakers in the mostly French speaking Canton of Fribourg.

== History ==
Muntelier is first mentioned in 1270 as Es Montelliers.

== Geography ==
Muntelier has an area of 1.1 km^{2} (0.42 sq mi). Of this area, 0.3 km^{2} (0.12 mi^{2}) or 26.5% is used for agricultural purposes, while 0.38 km^{2} (0.15 mi^{2}) or 33.6% is forested. Of the rest of the land, 0.41 km^{2} (0.16 mi^{2}) or 36.3% is settled (buildings or roads) and 0.04 km^{2} (9.9 acres) or 3.5% is unproductive land.

Of the built up area, industrial buildings made up 2.7% of the total area while housing and buildings made up 14.2% and transportation infrastructure made up 12.4%. Power and water infrastructure as well as other special developed areas made up 1.8% of the area while parks, green belts and sports fields made up 5.3%. Out of the forested land, 31.9% of the total land area is heavily forested and 1.8% is covered with orchards or small clusters of trees. Of the agricultural land, 20.4% is used for growing crops and 3.5% is pastures, while 2.7% is used for orchards or vine crops.

The municipality is located in the See/Lac district. This former fishing village is now a commuter town and part of the agglomeration of Murten.

== Coat of arms ==
The blazon of the municipal coat of arms is Gules on a Bend sable a Pike proper.

== Demographics ==
Muntelier has a population (as of December 2020) of 976. As of 2008, 11.1% of the population are resident foreign nationals. Over the last 10 years (2000–2010) the population has changed at a rate of 25.2%. Migration accounted for 24.1%, while births and deaths accounted for 1.1%.

Most of the population (as of 2000) speaks German (623 or 86.6%) as their first language, French is the second most common (57 or 7.9%) and Portuguese is the third (15 or 2.1%). There are 3 people who speak Italian.

As of 2008, the population was 49.3% male and 50.7% female. The population was made up of 380 Swiss men (42.8% of the population) and 57 (6.4%) non-Swiss men. There were 404 Swiss women (45.5%) and 46 (5.2%) non-Swiss women. Of the population in the municipality, 138 or about 19.2% were born in Muntelier and lived there in 2000. There were 142 or 19.7% who were born in the same canton, while 328 or 45.6% were born somewhere else in Switzerland, and 103 or 14.3% were born outside of Switzerland.

As of 2000, children and teenagers (0–19 years old) make up 18.2% of the population, while adults (20–64 years old) make up 68.2% and seniors (over 64 years old) make up 13.6%.

As of 2000, there were 254 people who were single and never married in the municipality. There were 394 married individuals, 35 widows or widowers and 36 individuals who are divorced.

As of 2000, there were 315 private households in the municipality, and an average of 2.2 persons per household. There were 94 households that consist of only one person and 11 households with five or more people. In 2000, a total of 313 apartments (92.1% of the total) were permanently occupied, while 22 apartments (6.5%) were seasonally occupied and 5 apartments (1.5%) were empty.

The historical population is given in the following chart:

== Heritage sites of national significance ==
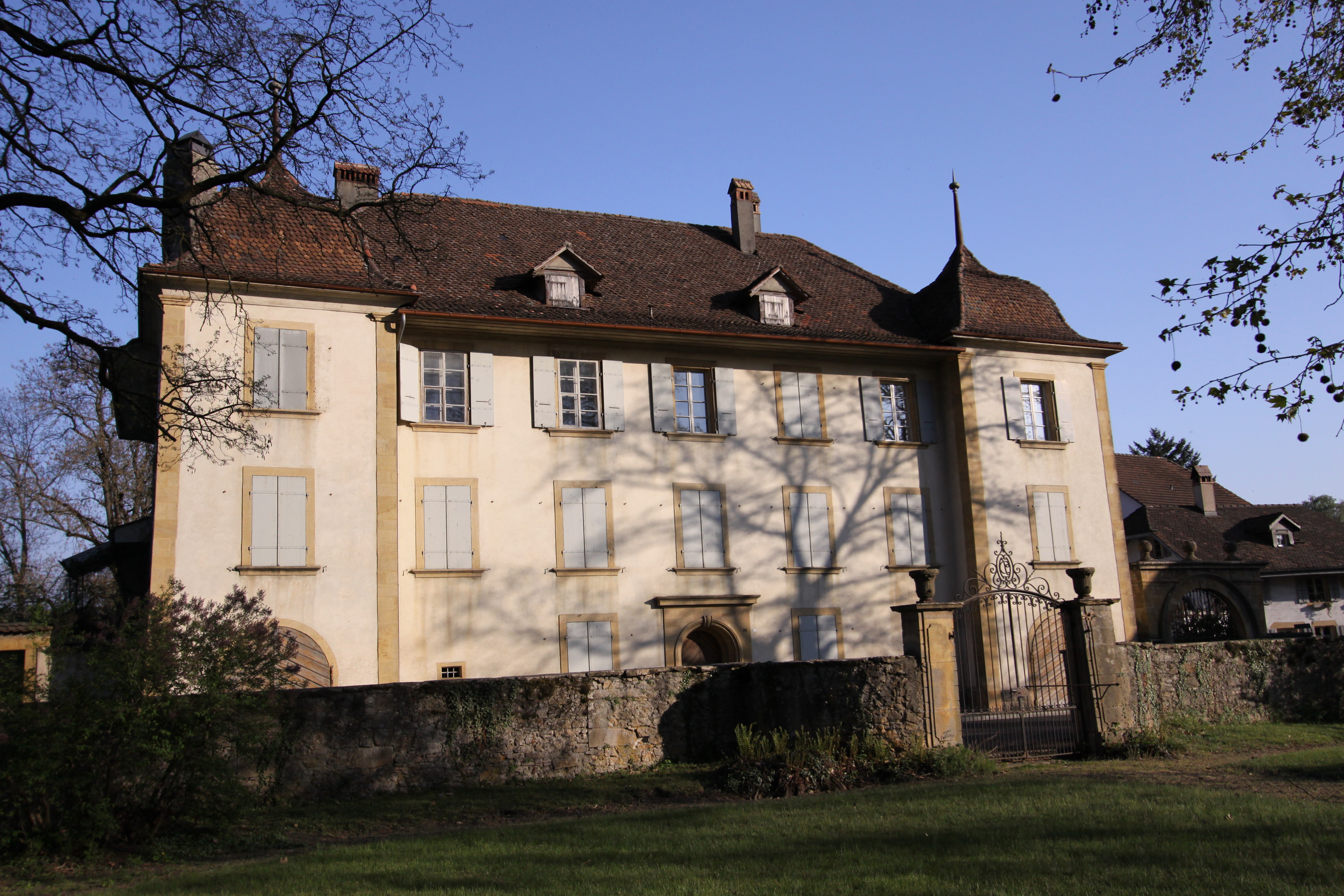
Von Ernst manor house

The Von Ernst Manor house and the Platzbünden are listed as Swiss heritage site of national significance. The entire village of Muntelier is part of the Inventory of Swiss Heritage Sites.

== Politics ==
In the 2011 federal election the most popular party was the SPS which received 20.5% of the vote. The next three most popular parties were the SVP (20.1%), the FDP (19.9%) and the Green Liberal Party (12.5%).

The SPS improved their position in Muntelier rising to first, from third in 2007 (with 14.7%) The SVP lost popularity (26.3% in 2007), the FDP moved from first in 2007 (with 26.4%) to third and the Grünliberale moved from below fourth place in 2007 to fourth. A total of 394 votes were cast in this election, of which 5 or 1.3% were invalid.

== Economy ==
As of 2010, Muntelier had an unemployment rate of 1%. As of 2008, there were 6 people employed in the primary economic sector and about 2 businesses involved in this sector. 127 people were employed in the secondary sector and there were 11 businesses in this sector. 317 people were employed in the tertiary sector, with 39 businesses in this sector. There were 426 residents of the municipality who were employed in some capacity, of which females made up 46.0% of the workforce.

In 2008 the total number of full-time equivalent jobs was 385. The number of jobs in the primary sector was 5, all of which were in agriculture. The number of jobs in the secondary sector was 117 of which 94 or (80.3%) were in manufacturing and 20 (17.1%) were in construction. The number of jobs in the tertiary sector was 263. In the tertiary sector; 147 or 55.9% were in wholesale or retail sales or the repair of motor vehicles, 1 was in the movement and storage of goods, 47 or 17.9% were in a hotel or restaurant, 1 was in the information industry, 19 or 7.2% were technical professionals or scientists, 2 or 0.8% were in education and 18 or 6.8% were in health care.

In 2000, there were 256 workers who commuted into the municipality and 350 workers who commuted away. The municipality is a net exporter of workers, with about 1.4 workers leaving the municipality for every one entering. Of the working population, 10.6% used public transportation to get to work, and 64.6% used a private car.

== Religion ==
From the 2000 census, 182 or 25.3% were Roman Catholic, while 433 or 60.2% belonged to the Swiss Reformed Church. Of the rest of the population, there were 6 members of an Orthodox church (or about 0.83% of the population), there was 1 individual who belongs to the Christian Catholic Church, and there were 5 individuals (or about 0.70% of the population) who belonged to another Christian church. There were 3 (or about 0.42% of the population) who were Islamic. There was 1 person who was Buddhist and 1 person who was Hindu. 77 (or about 10.71% of the population) belonged to no church, are agnostic or atheist, and 11 individuals (or about 1.53% of the population) did not answer the question.

== Education ==
In Muntelier about 317 or (44.1%) of the population have completed non-mandatory upper secondary education, and 166 or (23.1%) have completed additional higher education (either university or a Fachhochschule). Of the 166 who completed tertiary schooling, 63.3% were Swiss men, 23.5% were Swiss women, 9.0% were non-Swiss men and 4.2% were non-Swiss women.

The Canton of Fribourg school system provides one year of non-obligatory Kindergarten, followed by six years of Primary school. This is followed by three years of obligatory lower Secondary school where the students are separated according to ability and aptitude. Following the lower Secondary students may attend a three or four year optional upper Secondary school. The upper Secondary school is divided into gymnasium (university preparatory) and vocational programs. After they finish the upper Secondary program, students may choose to attend a Tertiary school or continue their apprenticeship.

During the 2010-11 school year, there were no students attending school in Muntelier, but a total of 129 students attended school in other municipalities. Of these students, 23 were in kindergarten, 57 were in a primary school, 21 were in a mandatory secondary school, 22 were in an upper secondary school and 6 were in a vocational secondary program. There were no tertiary students from this municipality.

As of 2000, there were 2 students in Muntelier who came from another municipality, while 96 residents attended schools outside the municipality.
