= Haut-Vully =

- Former municipality
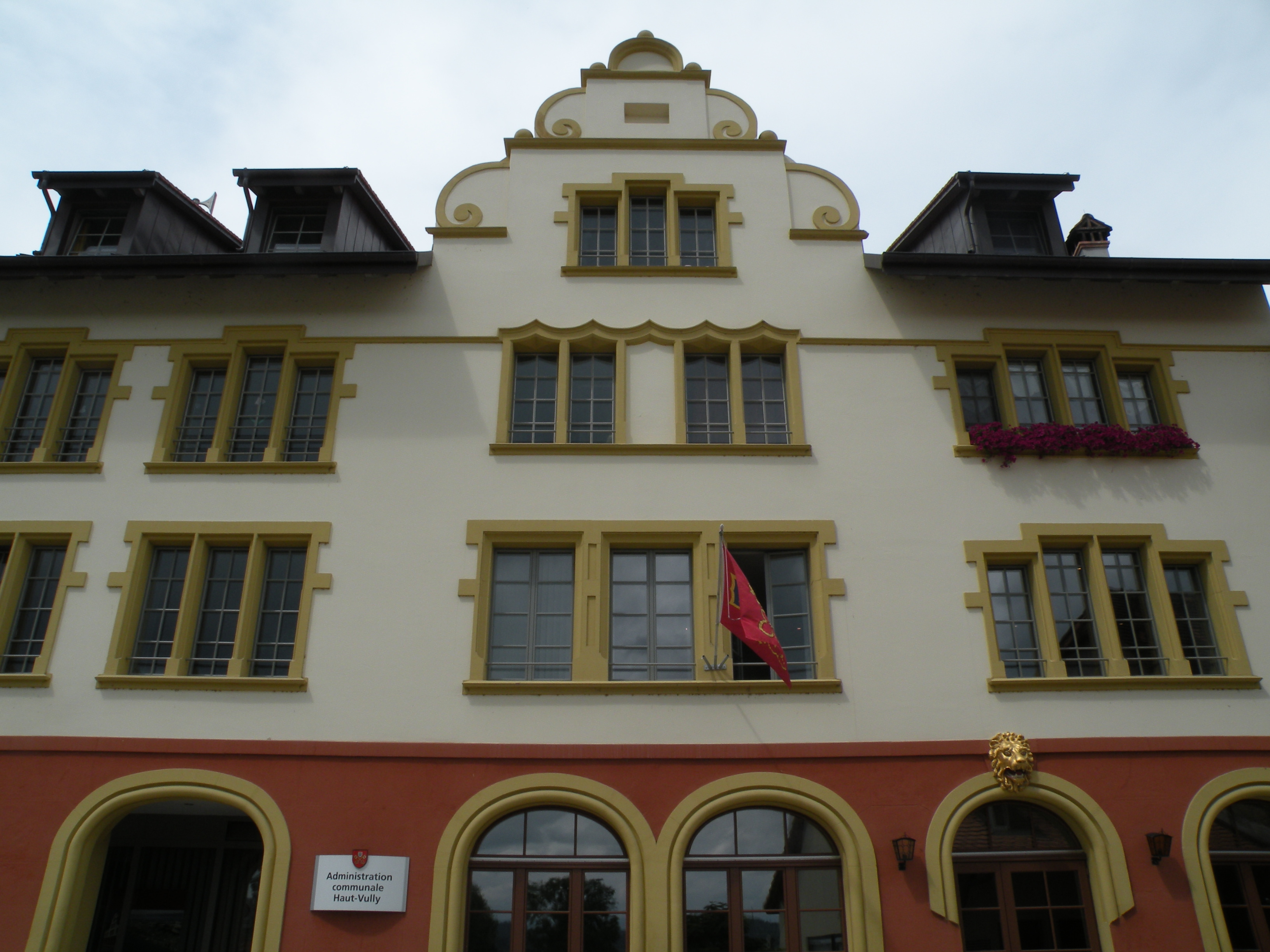
- Municipal administration building

- Coat of arms
- Location of Haut-Vully
- Location within Switzerland Location within Canton of Fribourg
- Coordinates: 46°57′N 7°5′E
- Country: Switzerland
- Canton: Fribourg
- District: See/Lac

Government
  - Executive: Conseil communal with 7 members
  - Mayor: Syndic

Area
  - Total: 7.47 km^{2} (2.88 sq mi)
- Elevation: 434 m (1,424 ft)

Population (December 2020)
  - Total: 1,375
  - Density: 184/km^{2} (477/sq mi)
- Time zone: UTC+01:00 (CET)
  - Summer (DST): UTC+02:00 (CEST)
- Postal codes: 1787 Môtier; 1789 Lugnorre
- SFOS number: 2281
- ISO 3166 code: CH-FR
- Surrounded by: Bas-Vully, Cudrefin (VD), Faoug (VD), Greng, Ins (BE), Meyriez, Mur (VD), Murten/Morat
- Website: mont-vully.ch

Haut-Vully (Arpitan: Hiôt-Vulyi) is a former municipality in the district of See/Lac in the canton of Fribourg in Switzerland. Until 1977, it was officially known as Vully-Le-Haut. Its German name of Oberwistenlach is now little used. On 1 January 2016 the former municipalities of Bas-Vully and Haut-Vully merged to form Mont-Vully.

== History ==
Haut-Vully is first mentioned around 968–85 as Vuisliacense. In 1453 it was mentioned as Vuilliez.

== Geography ==
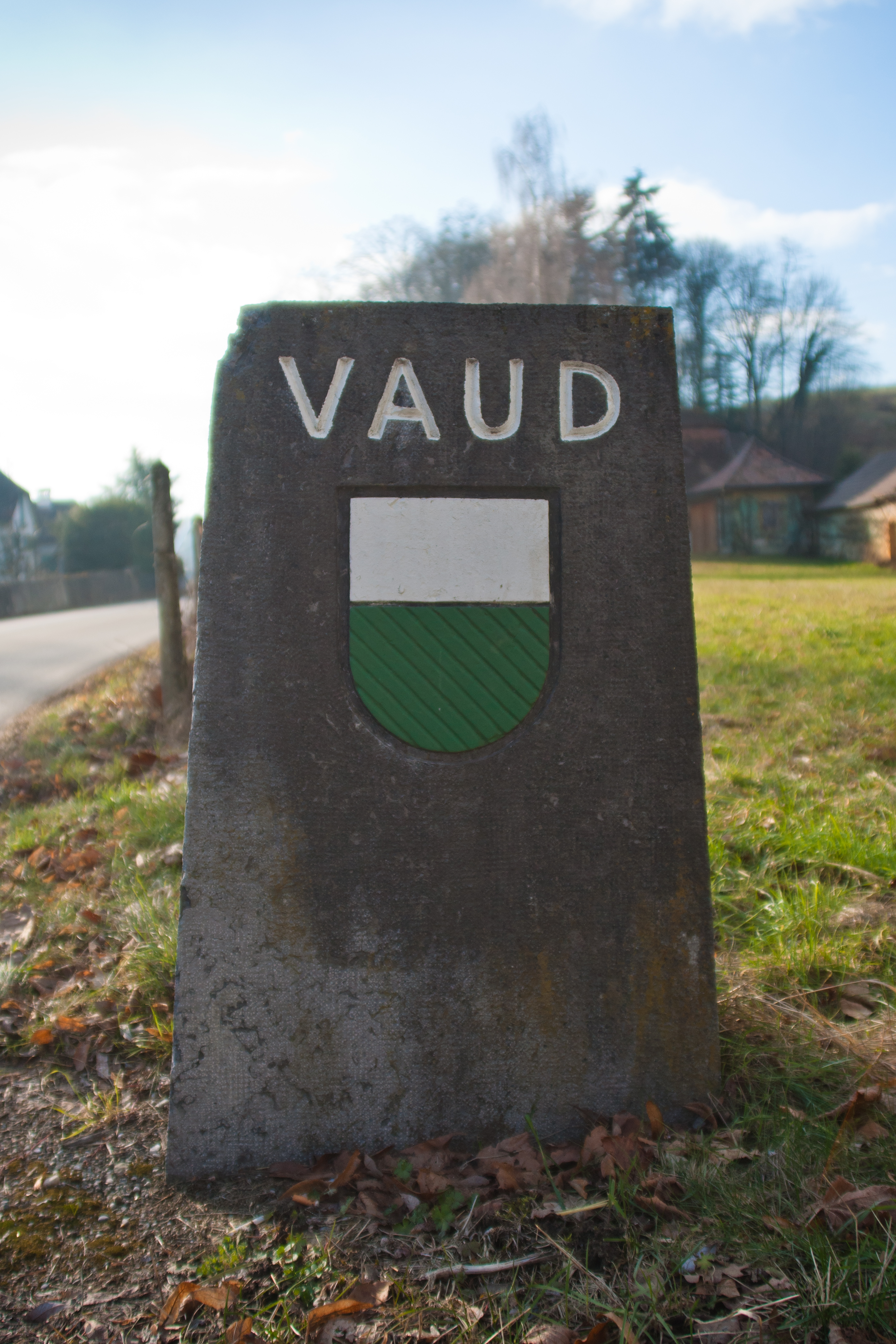
Border marker in Guévaux at the border with the Canton of Vaud.

Haut-Vully had an area, as of 2009, of 7.6 square kilometers (2.9 mi^{2}). Of this area, 5.34 km^{2} (2.06 mi^{2}) or 70.4% is used for agricultural purposes, while 1 km^{2} (0.39 mi^{2}) or 13.2% is forested. Of the rest of the land, 0.99 km^{2} (0.38 mi^{2}) or 13.1% is settled (buildings or roads), 0.19 km^{2} (0.073 mi^{2}) or 2.5% is either rivers or lakes and 0.05 km^{2} (12 acres) or 0.7% is unproductive land.

Of the built up area, housing and buildings made up 8.8% and transportation infrastructure made up 3.7%. Out of the forested land, 11.1% of the total land area is heavily forested and 2.1% is covered with orchards or small clusters of trees. Of the agricultural land, 54.7% is used for growing crops and 6.9% is pastures, while 8.8% is used for orchards or vine crops. All the water in the municipality is flowing water.

The former municipality is located in the See/Lac district, on the south-west flank of Mont Vully. The northern edge of the municipal area is the Broye river at Lake Neuchatel. It consists of the villages of Môtier, Lugnorre, Joressant and Mur along with the hamlet of Guévaux.

== Coat of arms ==
The blazon of the municipal coat of arms is Gules, in chief between two Keys Or in Saltire an Escutcheon Argent bordered Or five Fusils of the last

== Demographics ==
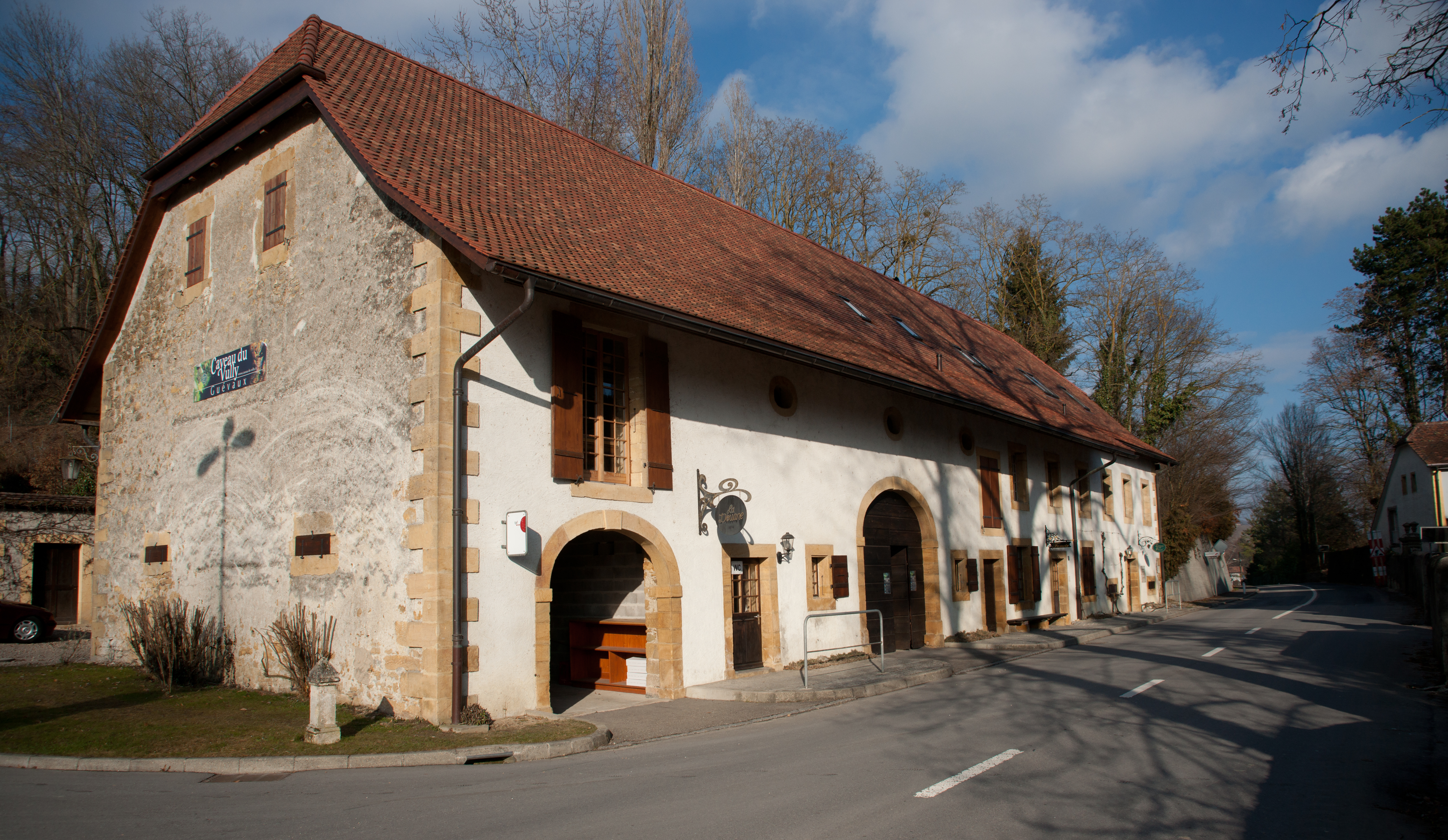
Building in Guévaux

Haut-Vully had a population (as of 2014) of 1,397. As of 2008, 12.1% of the population are resident foreign nationals. Over the last 10 years (2000–2010) the population has changed at a rate of 25.1%. Migration accounted for 23.3%, while births and deaths accounted for 3.4%.

Most of the population (as of 2000) speaks French (615 or 58.3%) as their first language, German is the second most common (385 or 36.5%) and Portuguese is the third (18 or 1.7%). There are 9 people who speak Italian.

As of 2008, the population was 50.7% male and 49.3% female. The population was made up of 582 Swiss men (44.2% of the population) and 86 (6.5%) non-Swiss men. There were 579 Swiss women (43.9%) and 71 (5.4%) non-Swiss women. Of the population in the municipality, 312 or about 29.6% were born in Haut-Vully and lived there in 2000. There were 146 or 13.8% who were born in the same canton, while 433 or 41.0% were born somewhere else in Switzerland, and 138 or 13.1% were born outside of Switzerland.

As of 2000, children and teenagers (0–19 years old) make up 22.2% of the population, while adults (20–64 years old) make up 60.7% and seniors (over 64 years old) make up 17.2%.

As of 2000, there were 366 people who were single and never married in the municipality. There were 586 married individuals, 55 widows or widowers and 48 individuals who are divorced.

As of 2000, there were 449 private households in the municipality, and an average of 2.3 persons per household. There were 124 households that consist of only one person and 24 households with five or more people. In 2000, a total of 429 apartments (67.8% of the total) were permanently occupied, while 163 apartments (25.8%) were seasonally occupied and 41 apartments (6.5%) were empty. As of 2009, the construction rate of new housing units was 8.2 new units per 1000 residents. The vacancy rate for the municipality, in 2010, was 0.67%.

The historical population is given in the following chart:

== Heritage sites of national significance ==
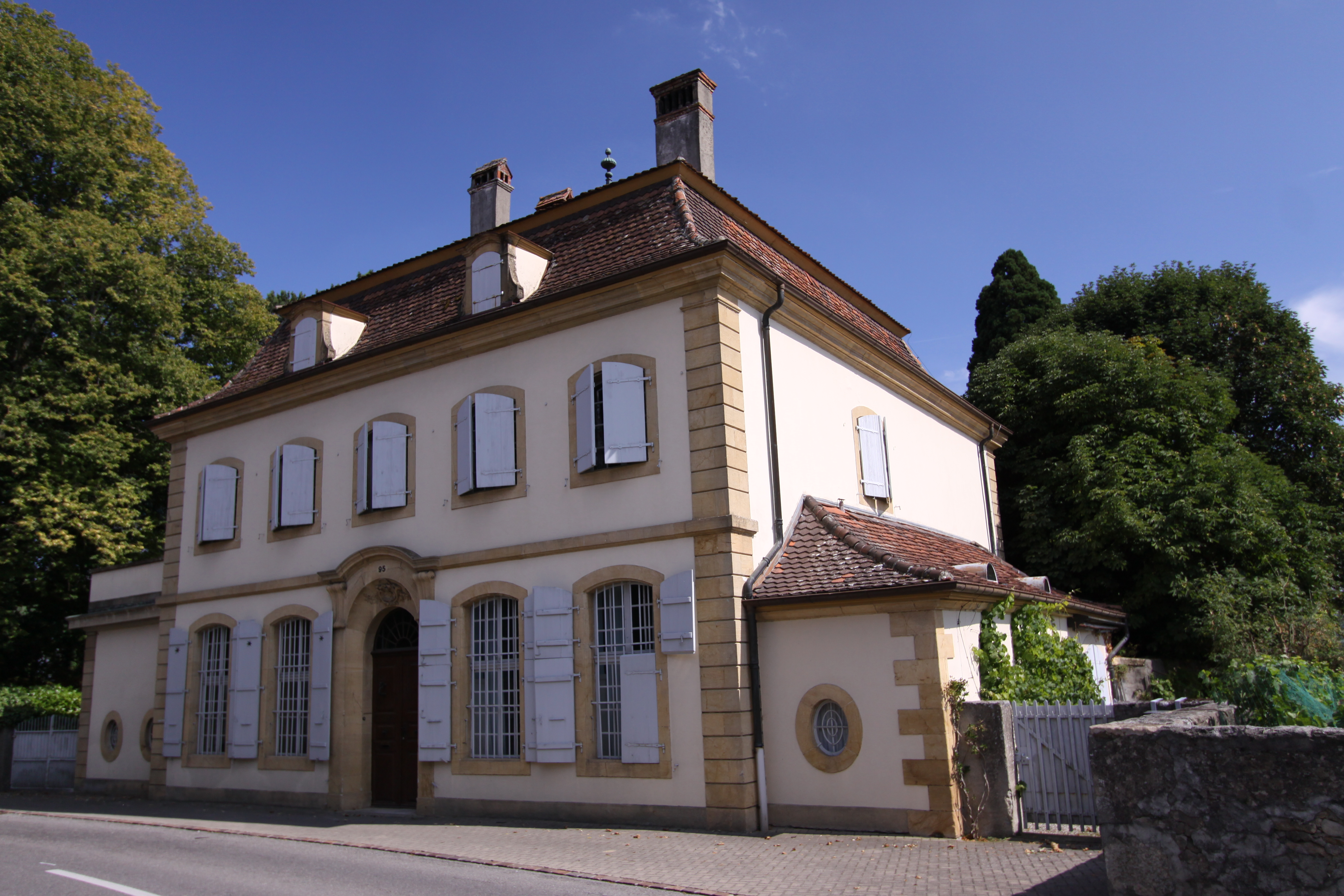
Gatschet House

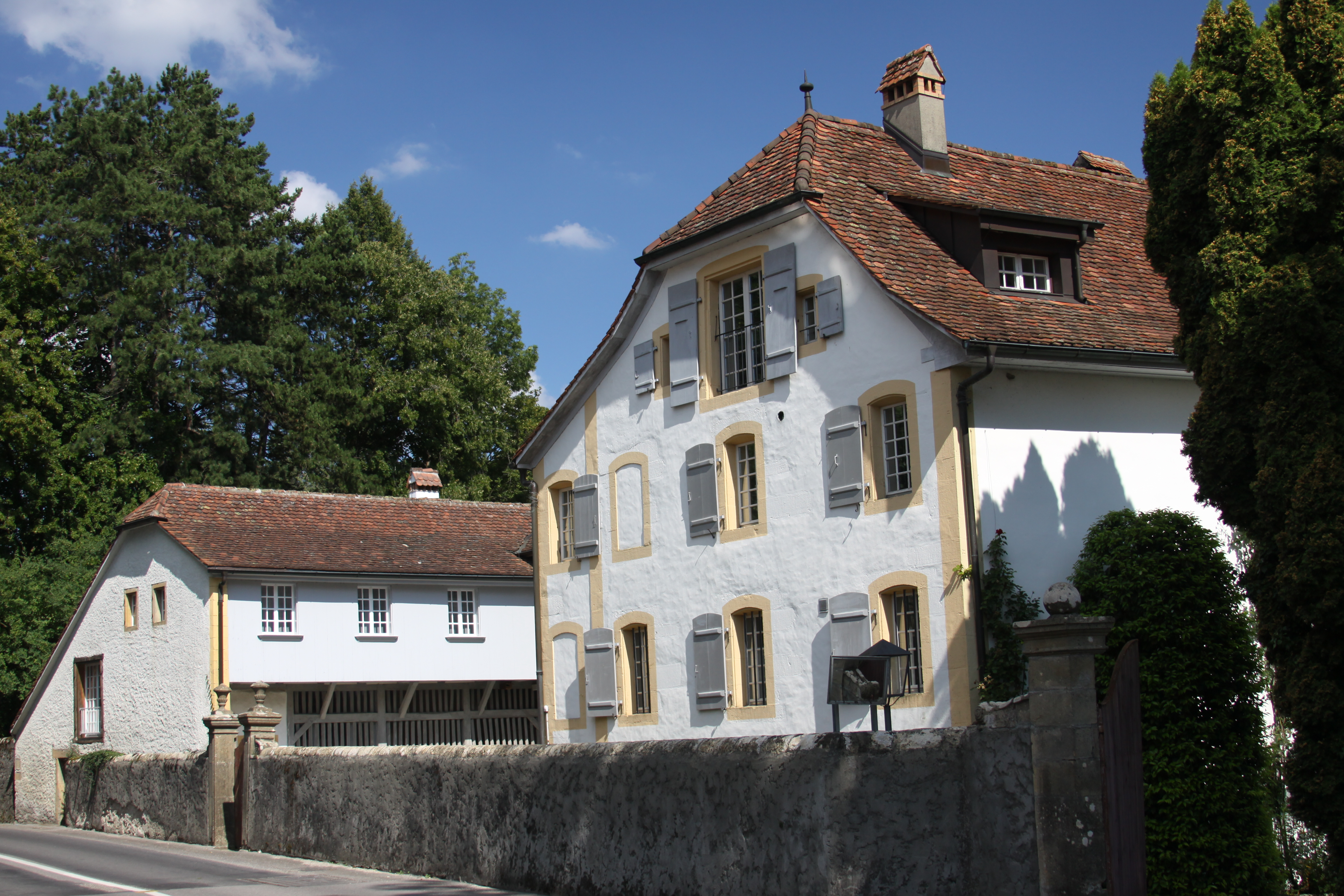
Les Rondas House

The House De W. J. Merz, the Gatschet House and the Les Rondas House are listed as Swiss heritage site of national significance. The entire village of Môtier is part of the Inventory of Swiss Heritage Sites.

== World heritage site ==
It is home to the Môtier I prehistoric pile-dwelling (or stilt house) settlements that are part of the Prehistoric Pile dwellings around the Alps UNESCO World Heritage Site.

The Môtier I site has been only lightly studied. It appears to be the site of a Neolithic settlement, based on the discovery of stone axes, but has not been more exactly dated. The site was discovered in 1860 by Colonel Schwab and may have contained decaying wooden piles during the 19th century. A small expedition in 2003 found a 70 cm (28 in) thick layer of artifacts. The settlement layer is buried under 50–250 cm (20–98 in) of earth and stretches over an area that is 190 m (620 ft) long and 50–70 m (160–230 ft) wide. The entire site is currently located on dry land and is covered by earth.

== Politics ==
In the 2011 federal election the most popular party was the FDP which received 22.5% of the vote. The next three most popular parties were the SVP (21.7%), the SPS (15.7%) and the Green Liberal Party (12.8%).

The FDP lost about 8.9% of the vote when compared to the 2007 Federal election (31.4% in 2007 vs 22.5% in 2011). The SVP retained about the same popularity (25.5% in 2007), the SPS moved from fourth in 2007 (with 13.0%) to third and the Green Liberal Party moved from below fourth place in 2007 to fourth. A total of 568 votes were cast in this election, of which 3 or 0.5% were invalid.

== Economy ==
As of 2010, Haut-Vully had an unemployment rate of 2%. As of 2008, there were 106 people employed in the primary economic sector and about 27 businesses involved in this sector. 59 people were employed in the secondary sector and there were 14 businesses in this sector. 138 people were employed in the tertiary sector, with 38 businesses in this sector. There were 575 residents of the municipality who were employed in some capacity, of which females made up 44.3% of the workforce.

In 2008 the total number of full-time equivalent jobs was 241. The number of jobs in the primary sector was 80, of which 78 were in agriculture and 2 were in fishing or fisheries. The number of jobs in the secondary sector was 52 of which 25 or (48.1%) were in manufacturing and 27 (51.9%) were in construction. The number of jobs in the tertiary sector was 109. In the tertiary sector; 18 or 16.5% were in wholesale or retail sales or the repair of motor vehicles, 8 or 7.3% were in the movement and storage of goods, 35 or 32.1% were in a hotel or restaurant, 1 was in the information industry, 5 or 4.6% were the insurance or financial industry, 8 or 7.3% were technical professionals or scientists, 5 or 4.6% were in education.

In 2000, there were 68 workers who commuted into the municipality and 395 workers who commuted away. The municipality is a net exporter of workers, with about 5.8 workers leaving the municipality for every one entering. Of the working population, 5.4% used public transportation to get to work, and 68.2% used a private car.

== Religion ==
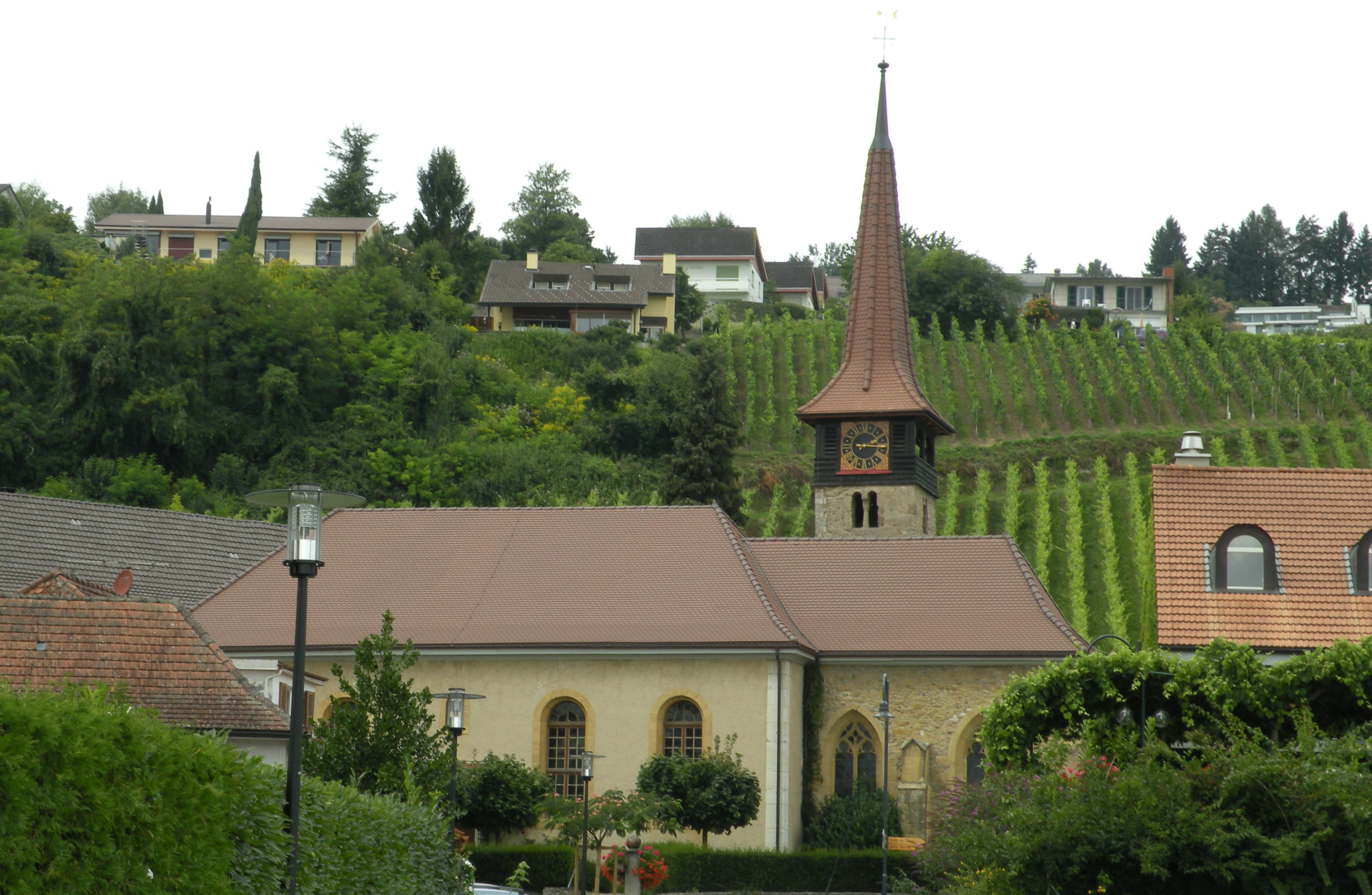
Church in Môtier

From the 2000 census, 238 or 22.6% were Roman Catholic, while 642 or 60.9% belonged to the Swiss Reformed Church. Of the rest of the population, there were 2 individuals (or about 0.19% of the population) who belonged to the Christian Catholic Church, and there were 46 individuals (or about 4.36% of the population) who belonged to another Christian church. There were 2 (or about 0.19% of the population) who were Islamic. There were 1 individual who belonged to another church. 110 (or about 10.43% of the population) belonged to no church, are agnostic or atheist, and 37 individuals (or about 3.51% of the population) did not answer the question.

== Education ==
In Haut-Vully about 348 or (33.0%) of the population have completed non-mandatory upper secondary education, and 233 or (22.1%) have completed additional higher education (either university or a Fachhochschule). Of the 233 who completed tertiary schooling, 62.7% were Swiss men, 29.6% were Swiss women, 4.3% were non-Swiss men and 3.4% were non-Swiss women.

The Canton of Fribourg school system provides one year of non-obligatory Kindergarten, followed by six years of Primary school. This is followed by three years of obligatory lower Secondary school where the students are separated according to ability and aptitude. Following the lower Secondary students may attend a three or four year optional upper Secondary school. The upper Secondary school is divided into gymnasium (university preparatory) and vocational programs. After they finish the upper Secondary program, students may choose to attend a Tertiary school or continue their apprenticeship.

During the 2010–11 school year, there were a total of 87 students attending 5 classes in Haut-Vully. A total of 161 students from the municipality attended any school, either in the municipality or outside of it. There was one kindergarten class with a total of 12 students in the municipality. The municipality had 4 primary classes and 75 students. During the same year, there were no lower secondary classes in the municipality, but 38 students attended lower secondary school in a neighboring municipality. There were no upper Secondary classes or vocational classes, but there were 10 upper Secondary students and 18 upper Secondary vocational students who attended classes in another municipality. The municipality had no non-university Tertiary classes, but there were 4 specialized Tertiary students who attended classes in another municipality.

As of 2000, there were 23 students in Haut-Vully who came from another municipality, while 100 residents attended schools outside the municipality.
