= Mont-Vully =

- Municipality
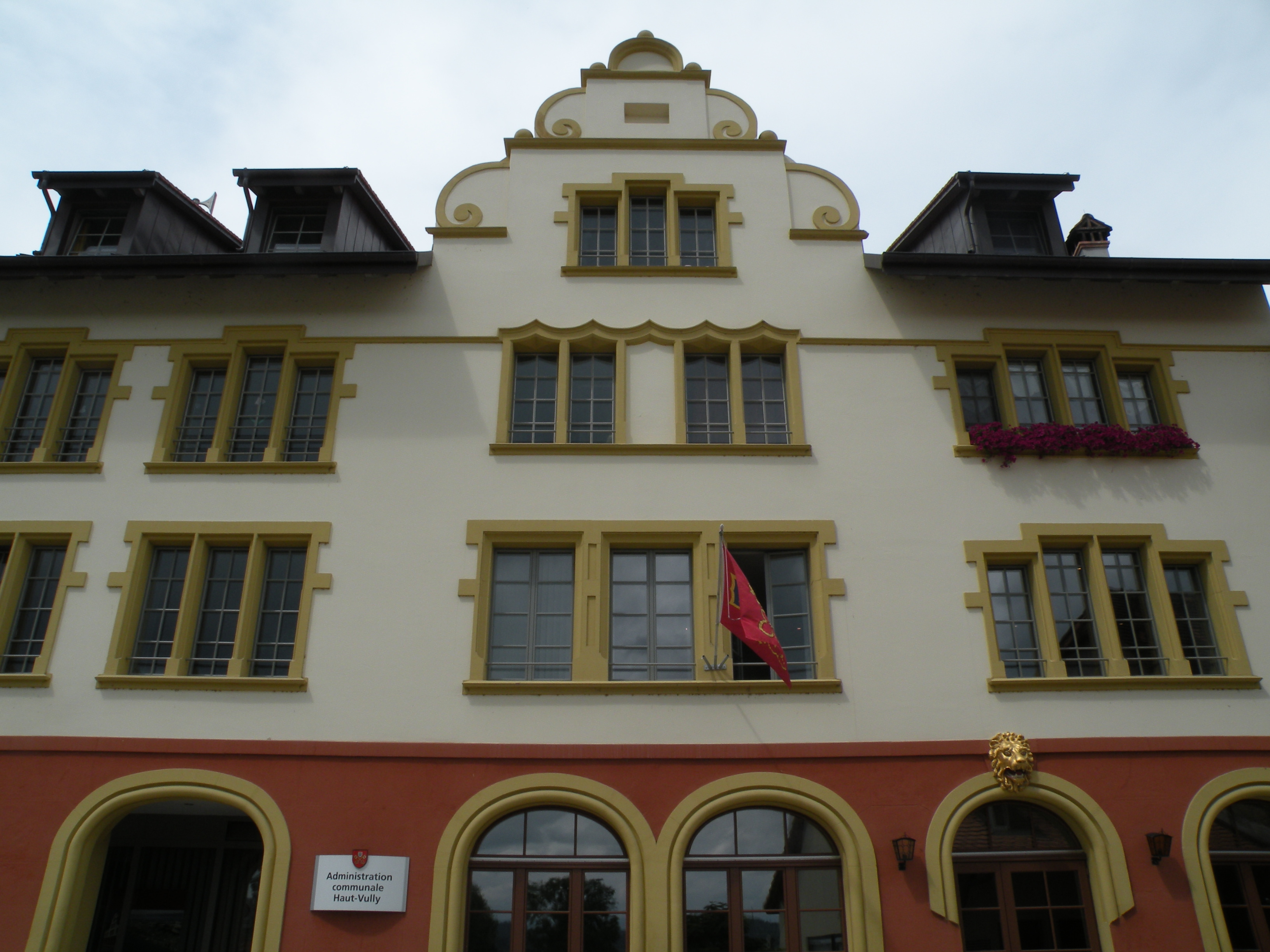
- Municipal administration building in Haut-Vully

- Coat of arms
- Location of Mont-Vully
- Location within Switzerland Location within Canton of Fribourg
- Coordinates: 46°57′N 7°5′E
- Country: Switzerland
- Canton: Fribourg
- District: See

Area
  - Total: 7.47 km^{2} (2.88 sq mi)

Population (Dec 2014)
  - Total: 1
  - Density: 0.13/km^{2} (0.35/sq mi)
- Time zone: UTC+01:00 (CET)
  - Summer (DST): UTC+02:00 (CEST)
- Postal codes: 1787 Môtier; 1789 Lugnorre; 1786 Sugiez; 1788 Praz
- SFOS number: 2284
- ISO 3166 code: CH-FR
- Surrounded by: Cudrefin (VD), Faoug (VD), Greng, Ins (BE), Meyriez, Mur (VD), Murten/Morat
- Website: http://mont-vully.ch/ SFSO statistics

Mont-Vully (French: [mɔ̃ vyji]; Arpitan: Mont-Vulyi) is a municipality in the district of See in the Canton of Fribourg in Switzerland. It was formed on 1 January 2016 when the former municipalities of Bas-Vully and Haut-Vully merged.

== History ==
Haut-Vully is first mentioned around 968-85 as Vuisliacense. In 1453 it was mentioned as Vuilliez.

Bas-Vully is first mentioned in 968 as Williacense. Until 1831 it was known as vor Commune générale des quatre villages de La Rivière. The municipality was formerly known by its German name Unterwistenlach; however, that name is no longer used.

== Geography ==
Mont-Vully has an area of 17.51 km^{2} (6.76 sq mi).

== Demographics ==
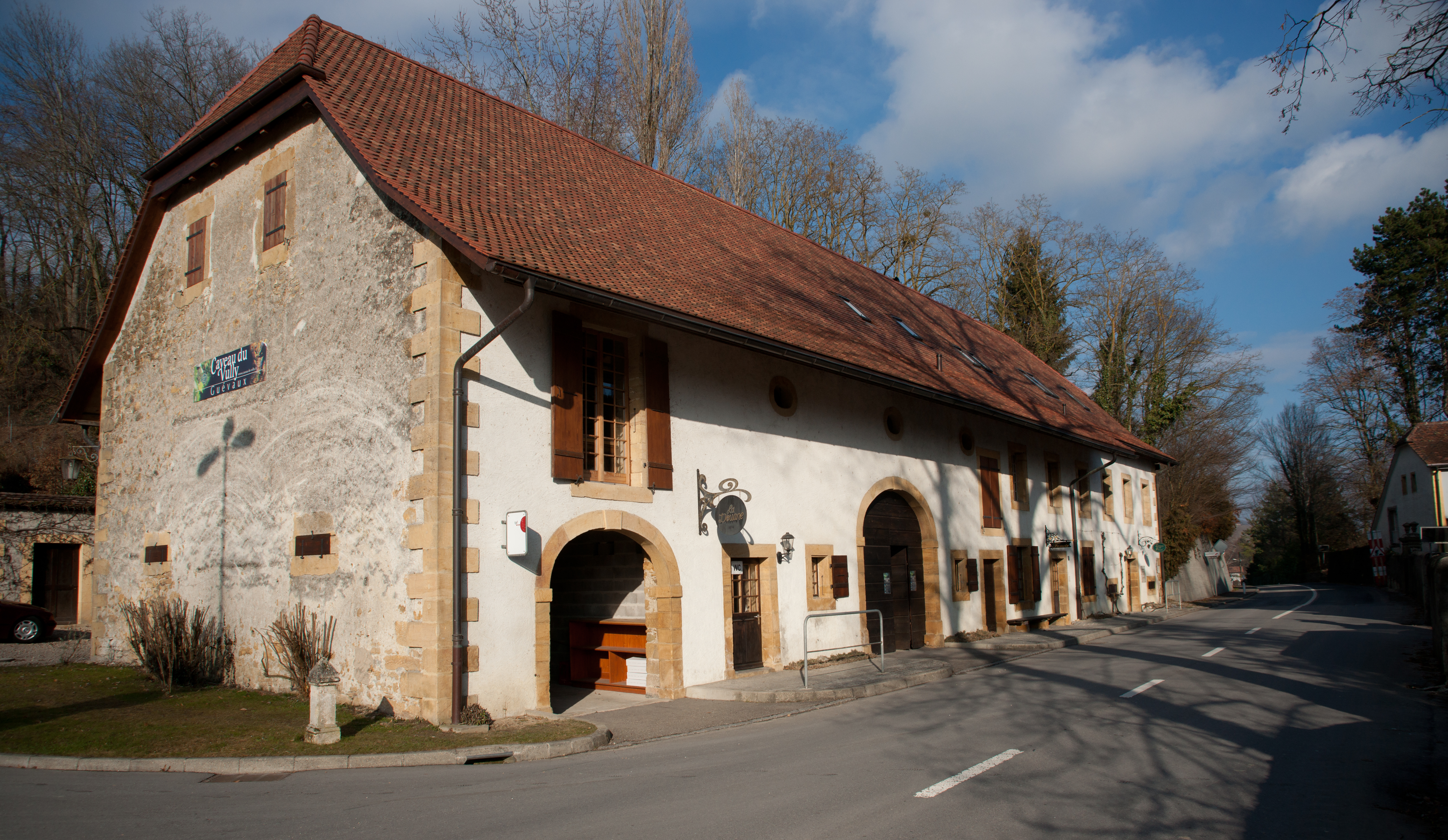
Building in Guévaux

Mont-Vully has a population (as of December 2020) of 4,123.

== Heritage sites of national significance ==
The House De W. J. Merz, the Gatschet House, the Les Rondas House, the De Steiger House, the d’Erlach-Velga House, the de Wattenwyl House and the oppidum of Mont Vully are listed as Swiss heritage site of national significance. The entire villages of Môtier and of Praz are part of the Inventory of Swiss Heritage Sites.

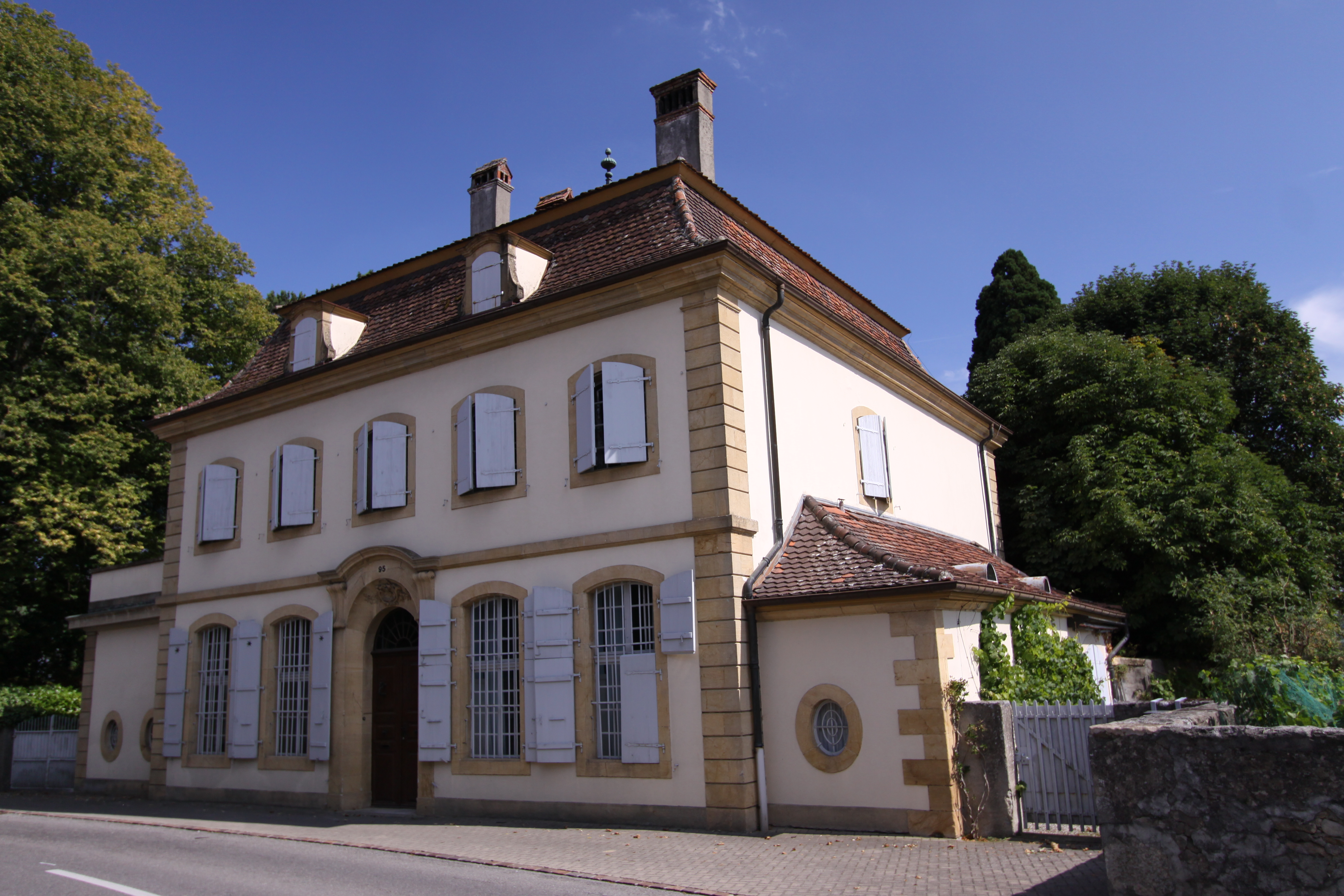
Gatschet House

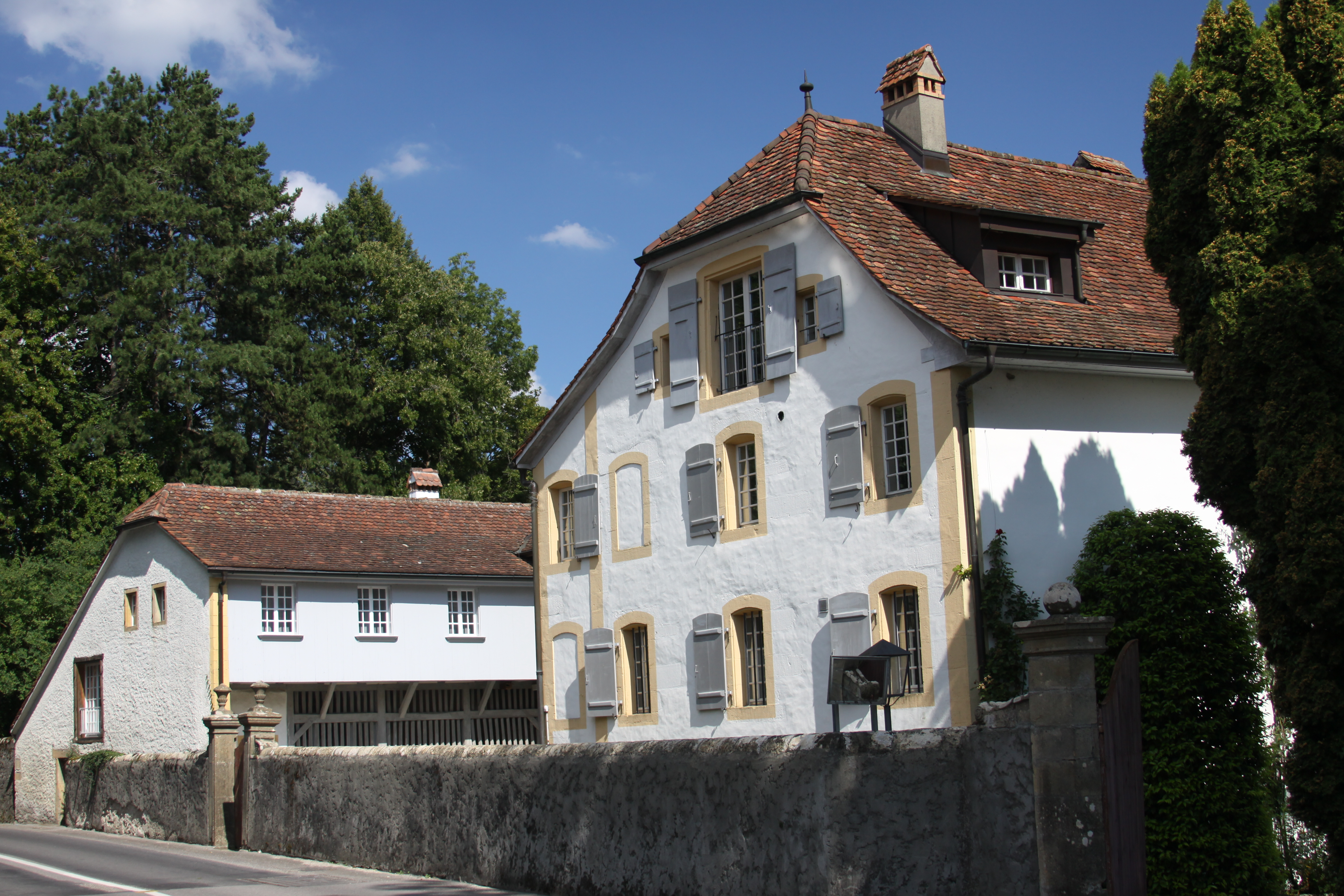
Les Rondas House

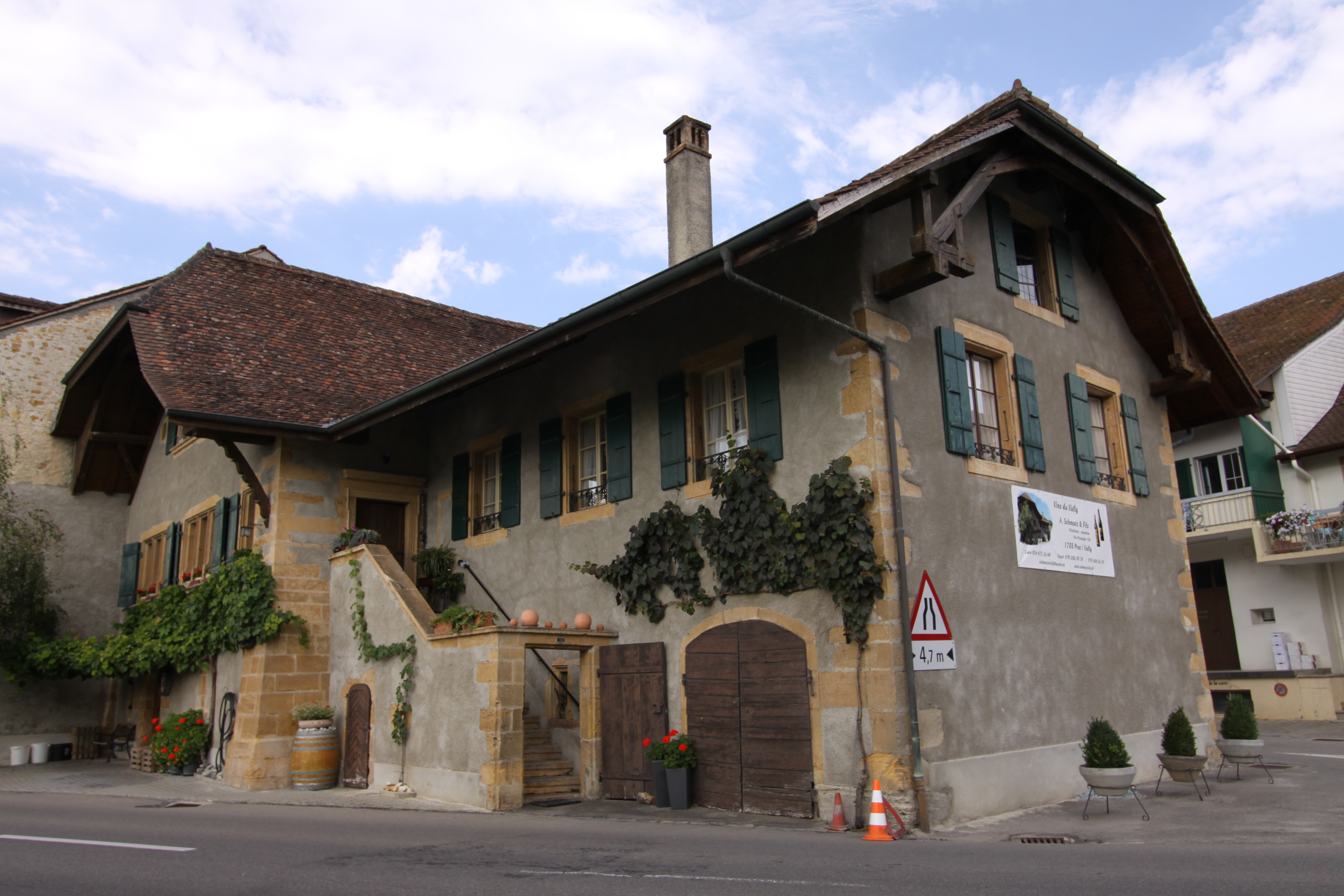
De Steiger House

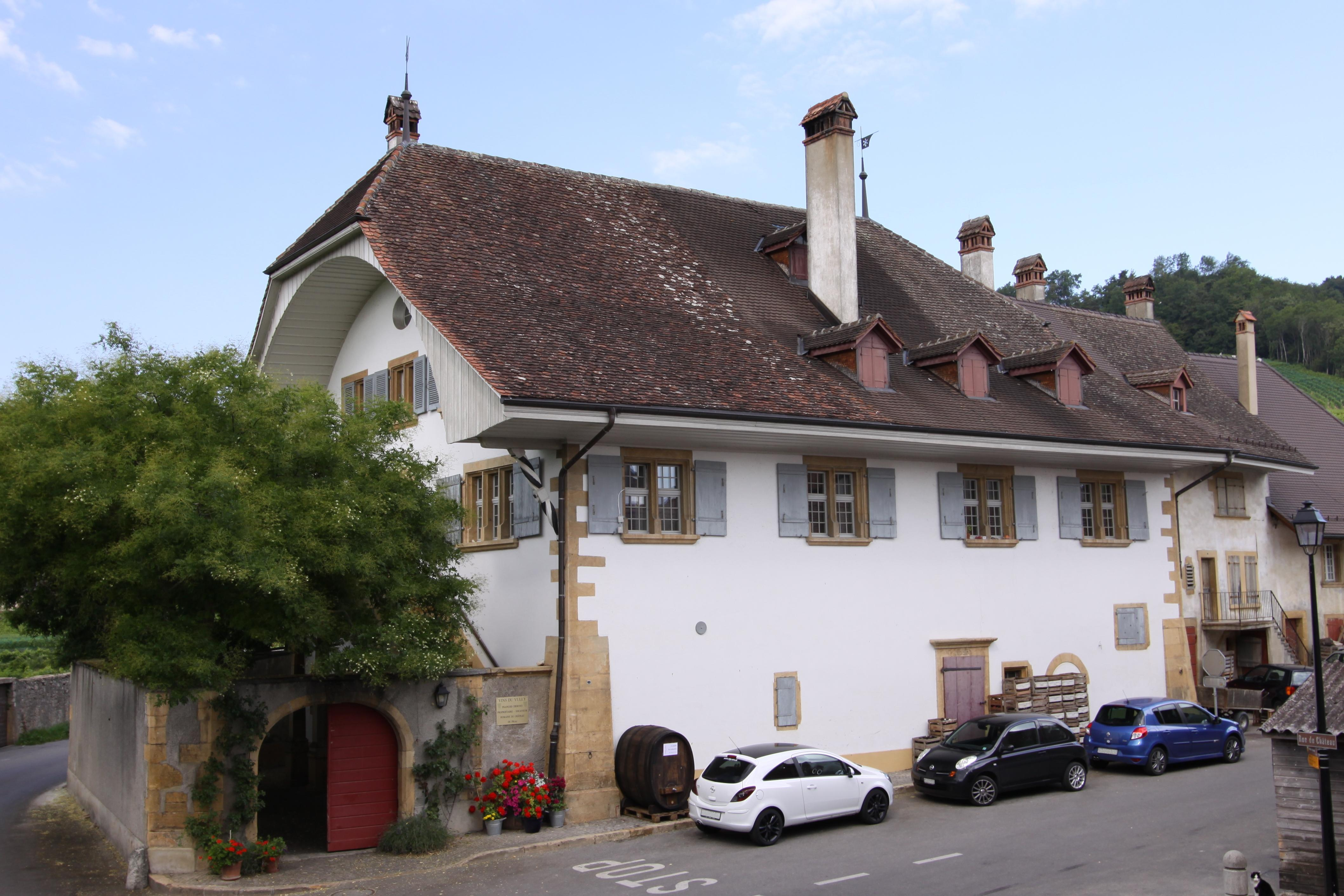
d’Erlach-Velga House

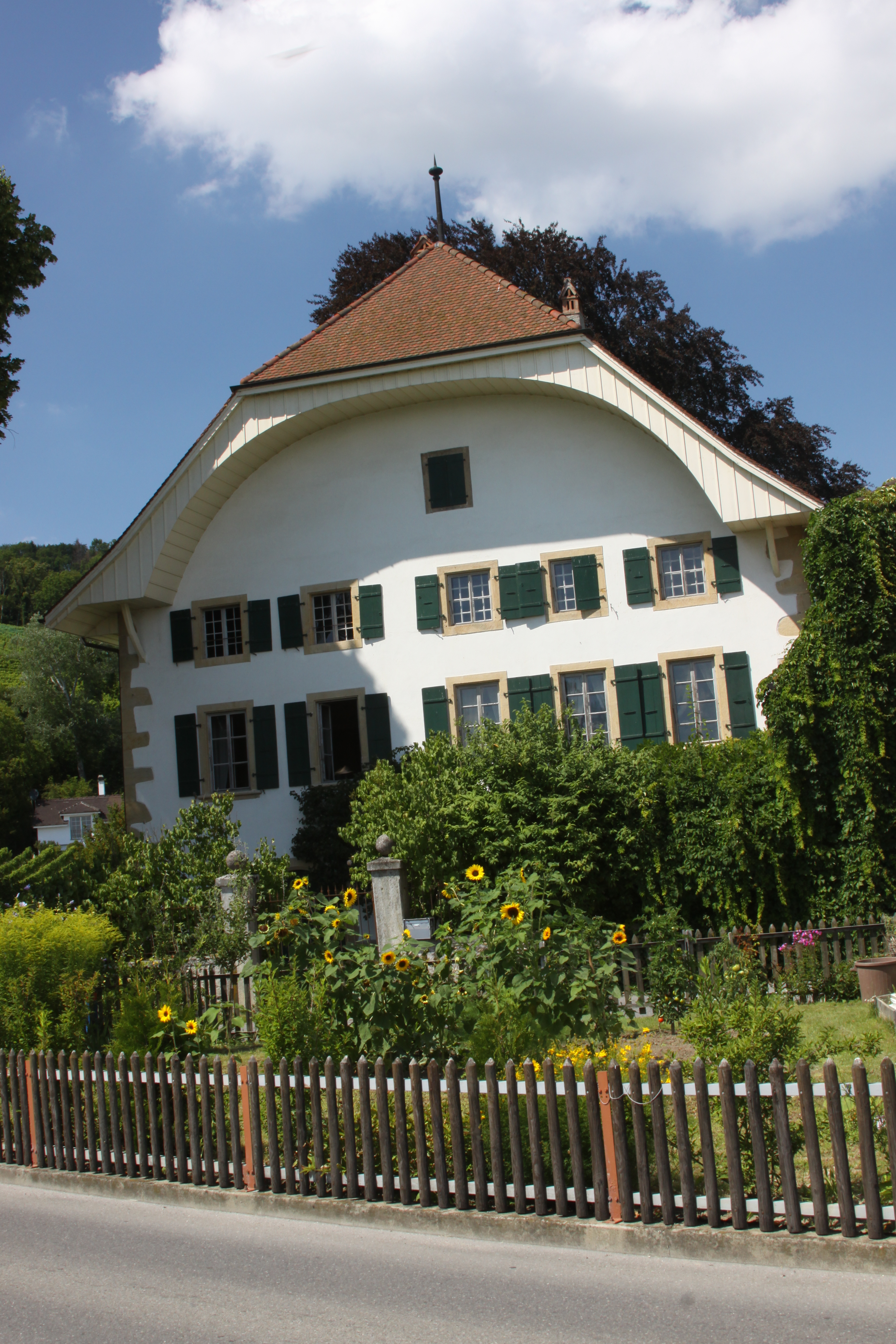
de Wattenwyl House

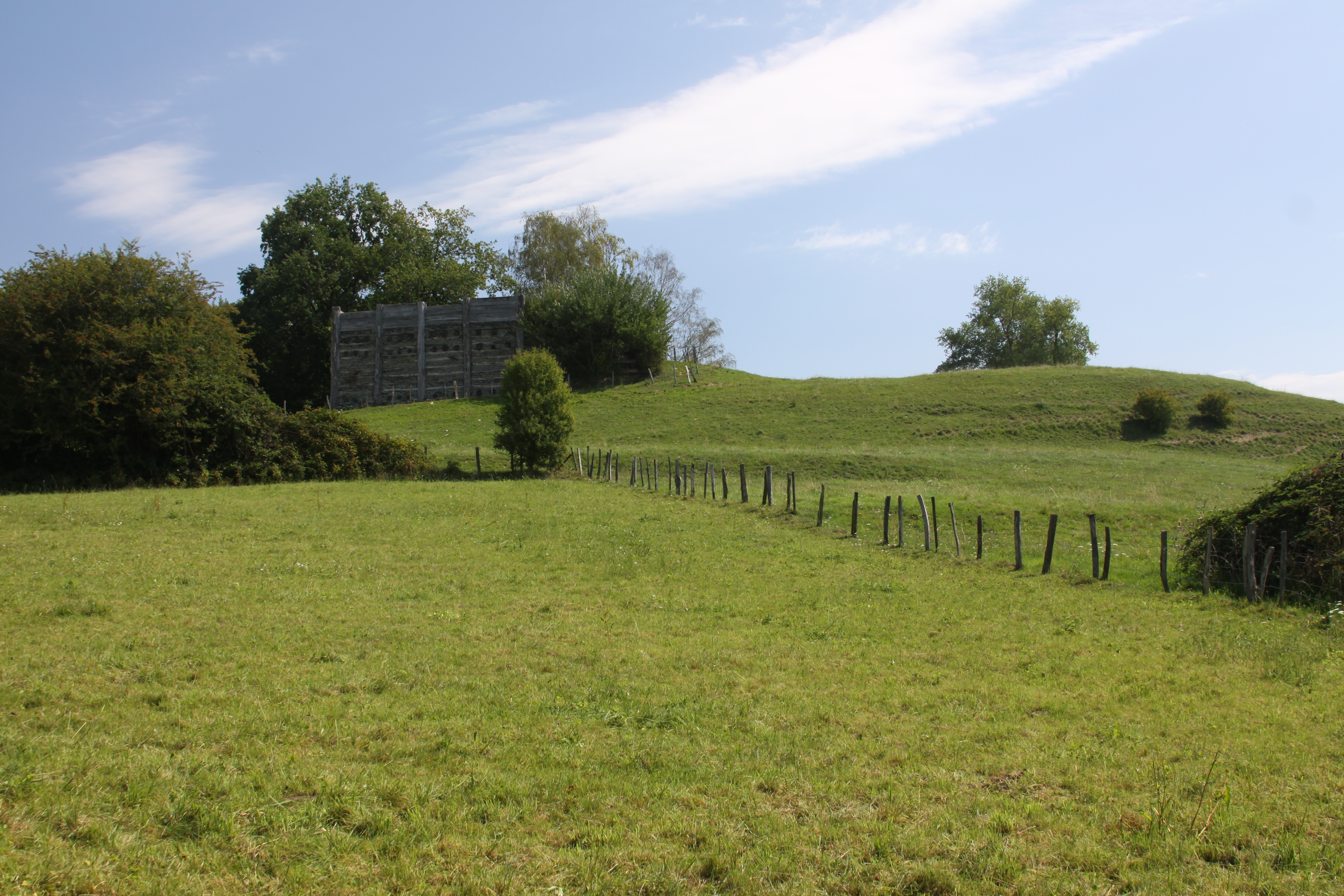
Mont Vully

== World heritage site ==
It is home to the Môtier I prehistoric pile-dwelling (or stilt house) settlements that are part of the Prehistoric Pile dwellings around the Alps UNESCO World Heritage Site.

The Môtier I site has been only lightly studied. It appears to be the site of a Neolithic settlement, based on the discovery of stone axes, but has not been more exactly dated. The site was discovered in 1860 by Colonel Schwab and may have contained decaying wooden piles during the 19th century. A small expedition in 2003 found a 70 cm (28 in) thick layer of artifacts. The settlement layer is buried under 50–250 cm (20–98 in) of earth and stretches over an area that is 190 m (620 ft) long and 50–70 m (160–230 ft) wide. The entire site is currently located on dry land and is covered by earth.

== Transportation ==
The municipality has a railway station, Sugiez, on the Fribourg–Ins line. It has regular service to Fribourg/Freiburg, Ins, and Neuchâtel.
