= Mont Vully =

Mountain in Switzerland

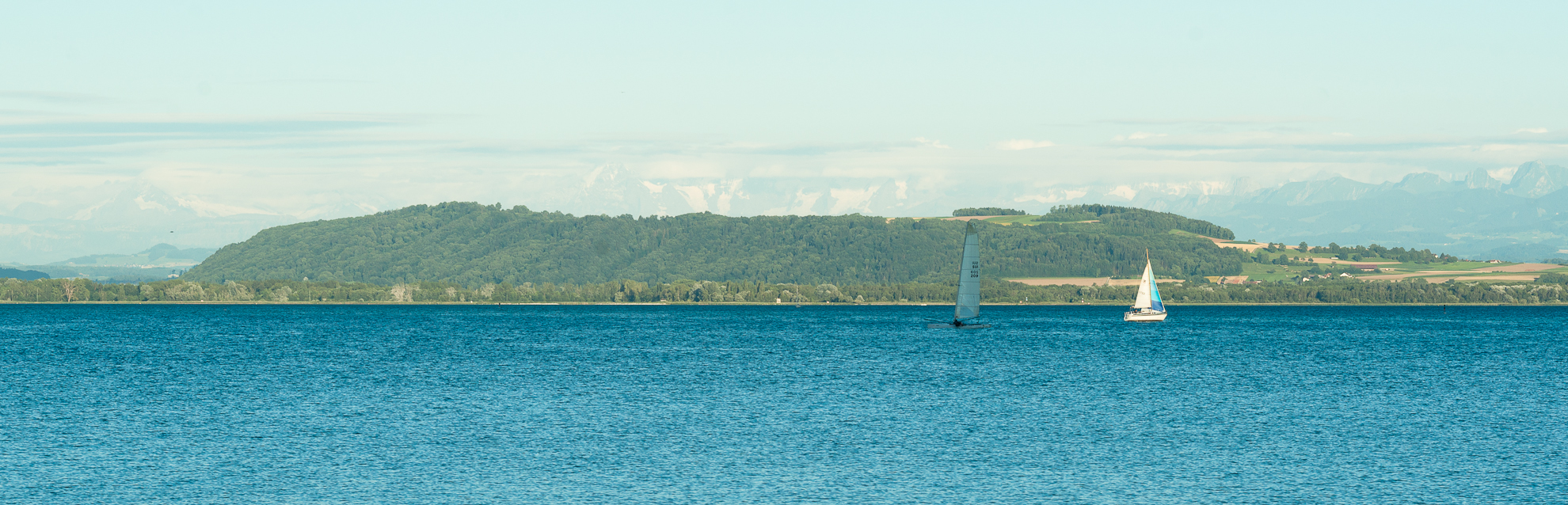
- View from Lake Neuchâtel (north side)

Highest point
- Elevation: 653 m (2,142 ft)
- Prominence: 173 m (568 ft)
- Isolation: 10.3 km (6.4 mi)
- Coordinates: 46°57′50″N 07°05′38″E

Geography
- Location within Switzerland
- Location: Fribourg, Switzerland

Climbing
- Easiest route: Trail

Mont Vully (653 m; in German also known as Wistenlacherberg) is a hill of the Swiss Plateau, located between Lake Morat and Lake Neuchâtel in the canton of Fribourg, east of the border with the canton of Vaud.

The south side, overlooking Murten and its lake, is covered by vineyards. The north side, overlooking Lake Neuchâtel, is mostly wooded.

== See also ==
- List of most isolated mountains of Switzerland
